= Geislbach =

River in Germany

- The Geislbach shortly before the inflow of the Matzbach

Location
- Country: Germany
- State: Bavaria

Physical characteristics
- Source
  - location: Kuglern, district of Walpertskirchen
  - coordinates: 48.2655°N 12.0070°E
- Mouth
  - location: near Esterndorf, district of Dorfen
  - coordinates: 48.2637°N 12.0888°E

Geislbach is a river of Bavaria, Germany in the district Erding. It is a left tributary of the Isen.

== See also ==
- List of rivers of Bavaria
