= Battle of the Inn =

913 battle

- Part of the Hungarian invasions of Europe
Date	913
Location	Aschbach at the bank of Inn River, Duchy of Bavaria
Result	Bavarian–Swabian victory

Belligerents
Principality of Hungary	East Francia; Duchy of Bavaria; Duchy of Swabia

Commanders and leaders
Unknown Hungarian commander	Arnulf, Duke of Bavaria; Count Erchanger; Count Burchard; Udalrich

Casualties and losses
Heavy	Unknown

The Battle of the Inn was fought in 913, when a Hungarian raiding army, at their return from plunder attacks against Bavaria, Swabia, and Northern Burgundy, faced the combined army of Arnulf, Duke of Bavaria, Counts Erchanger and Burchard of Swabia, and Lord Udalrich, who defeated them at Aschbach by the River Inn.

== Sources ==
The skirmish at the Inn River is mentioned by the Annales Alamannici (continued by Hermann of Reichenau in the 11th century), the Annales iuvavenses, the Continuatio Treverensis chronici Reginonis (the continuation of Regino of Prüm's Chronicon, who wrote at Trier in 967), and the Annales Sangallenses maiores (another continuation of the Annales Alamannici, compiled in the Abbey of Saint Gall). The last one suggests that "the entire [Hungarian] army was destroyed, but thirty men" ["nisi 30 viros"]. Historian Károly Szabó argued this figure is a result of a subsequent insertion. The battle is marginally also mentioned by the Annales Sancti Quintini Viromandensis.

== Background ==
The 16th-century humanist historian and philologist Johannes Aventinus' Annalium Boiorum libri septem (1523) contains more details about the circumstances of the battle. His work is mostly based on manuscripts written at the time of the battle, but since lost. Aventinus mentioned the event in two paragraphs. At first, he wrote: "The Hungarians demand tax payment from Arnulf, who refuses it. After that they invade the Bavarians. Arnulf surrounds and slaughters them". In the second paragraph, Aventinus has more detailed the events:

The Hungarians were there in every place of risk, demanding new tax payment both from Arnulf and King Conrad. They threatened if it will be refused, as Louis [the Child] did, they get torn everything to the ground. Arnulf replies to the envoys in the following manner: «I, he said, reign since my early youth, I did not learn to obey. If Hungarians come, we take up weapons, he flaunted, and they will experience the strength of our hands in a battle.» Hearing this, the Hungarians promptly invaded Bavaria with their large number of cavalry. Arnulf, who avoids [direct] combat, commands [his men] to retreat to protected sites with their belongings and equipment. He hides scattered [his] soldiers, knights beyond the forests, marshes and the threatened land of Noricum into ambuscades: [then] he appears leading a small number of selected riders near the enemy and, turning back, simulates fleeing.

— Annalium Boiorum

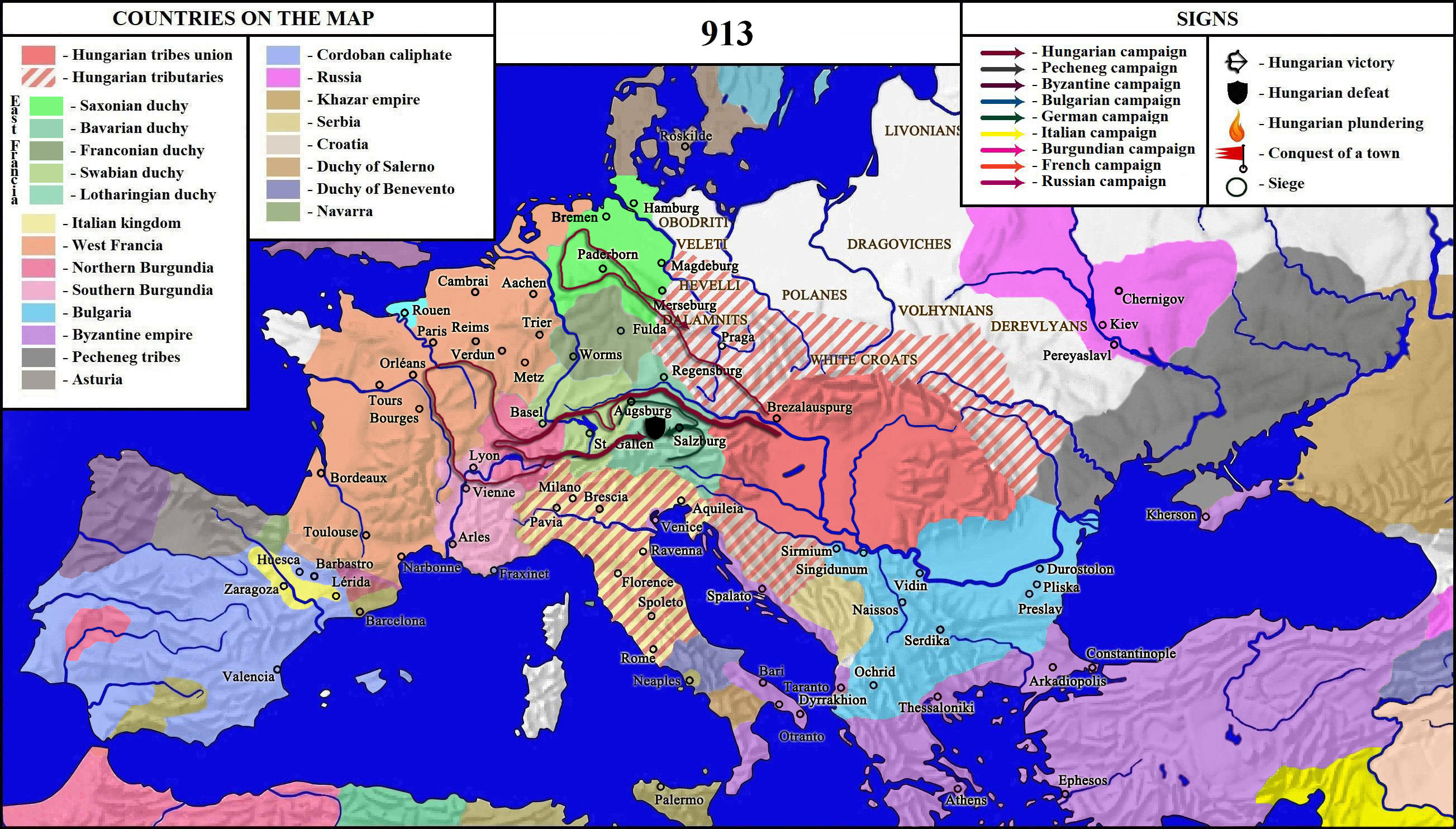
The Hungarian campaign in the East Frankish realms, Burgundy and West Francia from 913

Aventinus' narrative confirmed that Conrad was obliged to pay tribute to the Hungarians, as well as his predecessor Louis the Child, together with the Swabian, Frankish, Bavarian and Saxonian dukes, after the Battle of Rednitz in June 910. According to the chronicler, paying the regular tax was the "price of peace". After the western border was pacified, the Hungarians used the Eastern provinces of the Kingdom of Germany as puffer zone and transfer area to execute their long-range military campaigns to far West. Bavaria allowed Hungarians into their realm to continue their journey and the Bavarian–Hungarian relations were described as neutral during this time. Following the disastrous Battle of Pressburg (907), Arnulf strengthened his power through confiscation of church lands and the secularization of numerous monastery estates to raise funds to finance a re-organized defense, which earned him the nickname "the Bad" by medieval chroniclers. Despite "peace" which was guaranteed by regular tax payments, he was faced with constant raids from the Hungarians, when they entered the border or returned to the Pannonian Basin after a distant campaign. However the energetic and combative Arnulf already defeated a small Hungarian raiding contingent at Pocking near the Rott river on 11 August 909, after they withdrew from a campaign where they burnt the two churches of Freising. In 910, he also beat another minor Hungarian unit at Neuching, which returned from the victorious Battle of Lechfeld and other plundering attacks.

Historian István Bóna described the battle as a "destruction of a gang of robbers" who arbitrarily broke the conditions of peace. Other historians, who argue in favour of the lack of central organization of military campaigns, consider the Hungarian plunder attack in Bavaria after returning their war from West, which resulted Battle of the Inn, was merely a private action by a tribal chieftain or a small unit. Historian Levente Igaz argues the Bavarian was able to achieve success against the Hungarians only if they returned from a prosperous remote campaign with their booty, prisoners, and livestock which slowed down their marching. It is possible that after years of peace and stabilization, Arnulf felt strong enough to create new favorable conditions for his forced alliance with the Hungarians. After his disobedient behavior, the Hungarians launched a punitive expedition against his duchy, provoking a war. His conscious strategy was confirmed by the report of the Annales Alamannici, which wrote Arnulf concluded an alliance with his relatives, Swabian counts Erchanger and Burchard, and an influential lord Udalrich against the Hungarians. Aventinus' work also suggests that Arnulf used the Hungarians' "own military method" when ordered they soldiers to hide and imitating retreat, confirming a military cultural exchange at the Bavarian–Hungarian border.

== Reconstruction ==
The Hungarians, beyond the water of Enns, across Noricum, until its border to the river of Inn, with confidence in their warriors and multitude, bravely ravage because of their greater success, and wandering up and down with their nimble horses. When finally, they cross the Inn river, tiredly from gallops, they gather together: there they [decided to] camp, they were especially careless due to their former victories, and since no one dares to fight them, he [Arnulf] earns a major victory. Arnulf, who was hiding, discovering the unpreparedness of his enemies, is attacking from all sides: he appears suddenly, surround his enemy from all sides, slaughters all of them, as this warlike people used to do it, blocking the [escape] route. With a terrible attack by the spearhead riders from the left side, [also] spearmen from the right side, [while] Arnulf launches a frontal attack with archers to cut, chase, overbear and trap the Hungarians at the Inn, where [they] drown. The river, which protects them before that, becomes their enemy, the other bank of the Inn was invaded by soldiers upon the command of Arnulf, [where] they captured [the survivors] who were trying to cross, thus there is no space to escape for the enemy. All of them, leaving no survivors, were slaughtered and perished. The victorious Arnulf fulfills his victory vow, defends the borders of Bavaria with high forts, and instructs his brother Berthold to govern the Sennon and Athesinus people [in Noricum].

— Annalium Boiorum

Igaz argues the German allied forces attacked the Hungarians' camp near Altötting or Asbach, beyond the valley of Inn. As there is no report of any Hungarian military expeditions in the next year (914), several historians considered Arnulf's attack as "the first truly significant defeat" to the Hungarians since their series of invasions against Western Europe, which preceded the defeats at Riade (933) and Lechfeld (955). However, as Igaz points out, there were other examples when a small Hungarian unit was stalked and massacred, for instance, as Ekkehard preserved, when drunk and tired Hungarian invaders were perished by local at the village of Friccowe.

== Sources ==
- Bóna, István (2000). A magyarok és Európa a 9–10. században [The Hungarians and Europe in the 9–10th Century] (in Hungarian). Budapest: Hungarian Academy of Sciences. ISBN 963831267X.
- Igaz, Levente (2015). "Arnulf herceg 913-as győzelme a magyarok felett. Néhány megjegyzés a X. század első felének Kárpát-medence had- és politikatörténetéhez [The Victory of Duke Arnuld over the Hungarians in 913. Remarks on the Military and Political History of the Carpathian Basin in the First Half of the 10th Century]". In Tóber, Márta; Maléth, Ágnes (eds.). Középkortörténeti tanulmányok 8 (in Hungarian). University of Szeged. pp. 301–314. ISBN 978-963-315-242-3.
