= Strogen (river) =

River in Germany

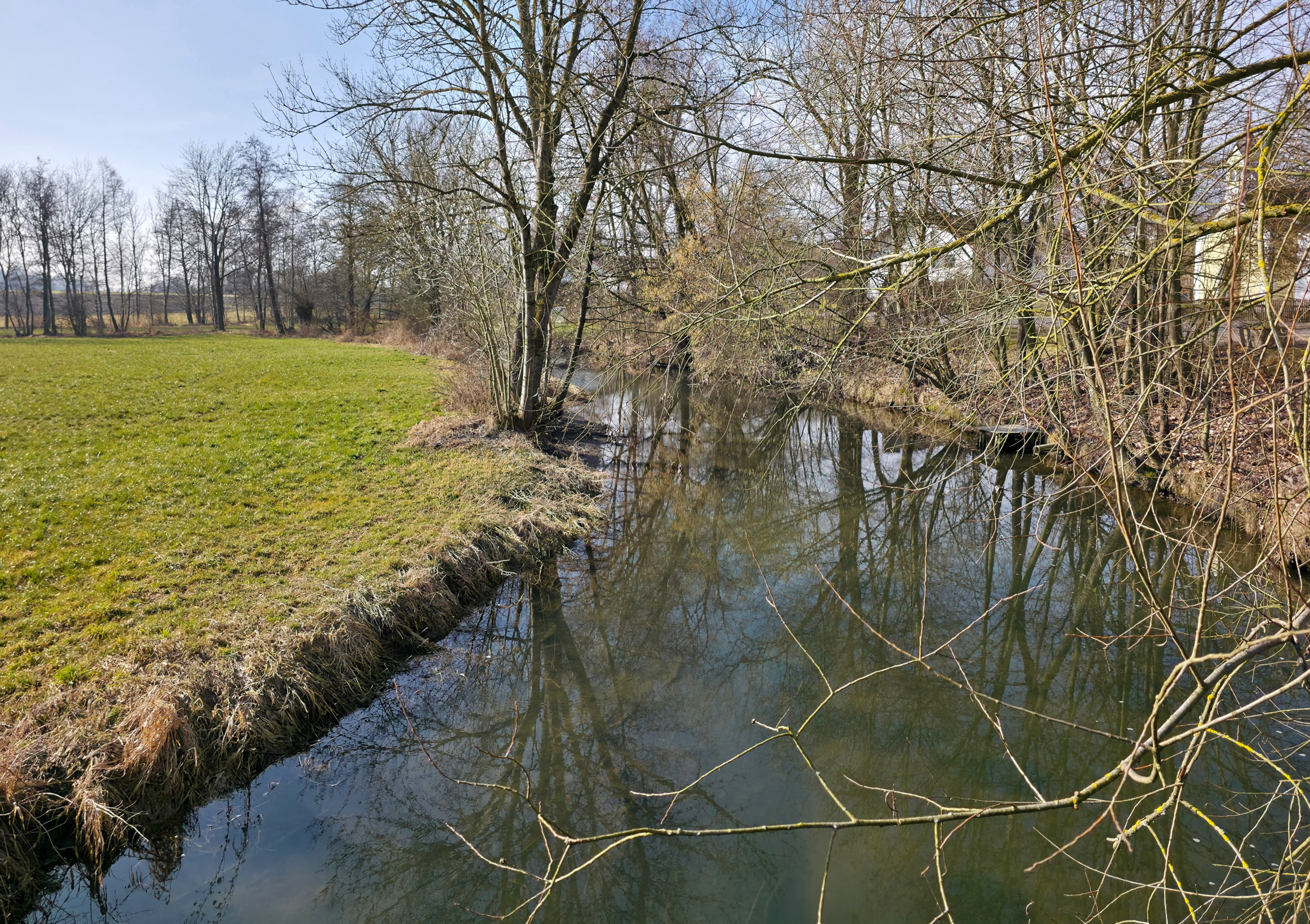
- The Strogen in Emling, a district of Bockhorn

Location
- Country: Germany
- State: Bavaria

Physical characteristics
- Source
  - location: northwest of Buch am Buchrain
  - elevation: 520 m (1,710 ft)
- Mouth
  - location: into the Sempt east of Moosburg
  - coordinates: 48.4667°N 11.9784°E
  - elevation: 415 m (1,362 ft)
- Length: 39.7 km (24.7 mi)
- Basin size: 146.48 km^{2} (56.56 sq mi)

Basin features
- Progression: Sempt→ Isar→ Danube→ Black Sea

Strogen is a river of Bavaria, Germany. It is a right tributary of the Sempt, is approximately 40 km in length, and drains a basin of approximately 146 km^{2} (56 sq mi). Its source is northwest of Buch am Buchrain in the district Erding. On its way north, the river splits into a main channel and the parallel "Strogenkanal", both of which join the Sempt, a tributary of the Isar, near Moosburg.

== See also ==
- List of rivers of Bavaria
