= Korbinian Aigner =

Korbinian Aigner, known as the Apfelpfarrer ("apple pastor"), (11 May 1885, in Hohenpolding, district of Erding, Bavaria – 5 October 1966, in Freising, Bavaria) was a Bavarian Catholic priest and pomologist.

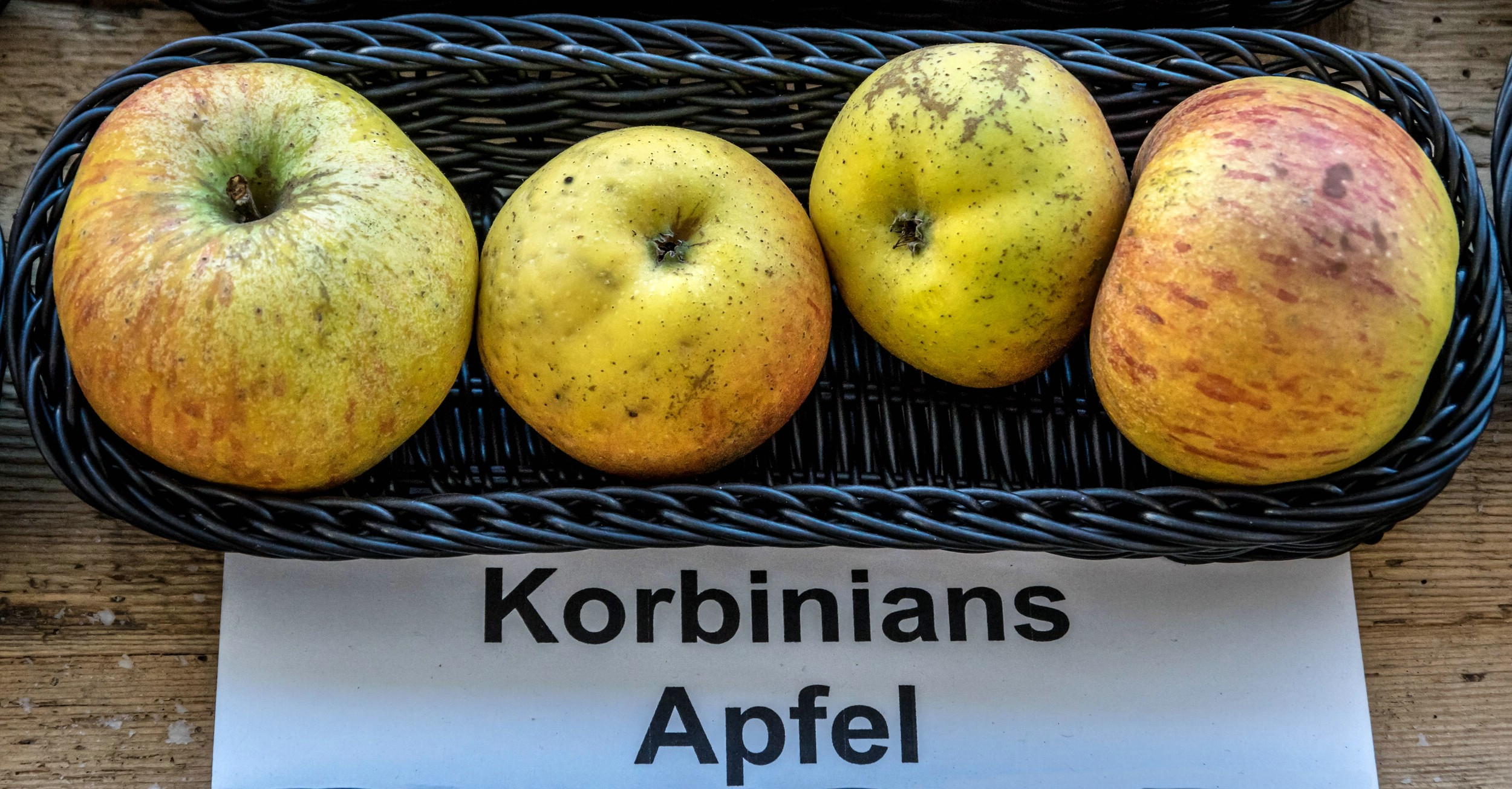
Apple variety KZ-3, named in honor of Korbinian Aigner

== Life ==
Korbinian Aigner was born on the substantial family farm at Hohenpolding on 11 May 1885. He was the eldest son and heir to the farm, but renounced his inheritance in favor of his ten younger siblings in order to become a priest.

=== School and university ===
From 1891 Aigner attended elementary school in Hohenpolding. In the autumn of 1896 he moved to the Archiepiscopal Gymnasium (Grammar school) in Freising. In 1904 he was not permitted to graduate however because of his inadequate performance in Greek and Latin studies. Aigner took the opportunity to move to the Luitpold Gymnasium in Munich. Thanks to the support of the school's Director, Georg Orterer, Aigner was able to graduate in the summer of 1906 without difficulty.

On 2 November of that year he entered the seminary at Freising and began studying theology.

Aigner took an early interest in the cultivation of fruit and on 15 August 1908 he co-founded the Hohenpolding Fruit Growing Association with Franz Hausladen, a weaver. When the association was founded there were 44 members and they elected Aigner their first president. The following year, the Bavarian State subsidized the association with a grant of 1,000 Marks. This sum enabled the association to set up a winery and the building is still used today by the Hohenpolding volunteer fire service as a clubhouse.

=== After ordination ===
In the summer of 1911 Aigner was ordained a priest by Archbishop Franziskus von Bettinger. He celebrated his first Mass in Hohenpolding. Shortly afterwards he was sent to Ilmmünster as associate pastor and at the same time appointed as an art teacher at the boys' seminary at Scheyern Abbey. Among his students were Alois Hundhammer, Josef Schwalber and Josef Martin Bauer. It is possible that he began his project of painting apple varieties at this early stage though there is as yet no clear evidence.

In 1916 Aigner took up the post of associate pastor at Grafing near Munich and in 1921 moved to a similar position Haimhausen. In 1925 he was appointed an assistant at Söllhuben and a year later, transferred to Dorfen where he remained for the next five years. In July 1931 he was promoted to the post of parish priest in Sittenbach. Then on 19 August 1931, at the age of 46, he was finally appointed pastor.

During these years, Aigner spent every spare minute he had travelling to give lectures on fruit cultivation and advising interested parties. He was elected president of the Horticultural Society of Upper Bavaria in 1930 and began publishing numerous articles in the association journal at this time.

=== Arrest and concentration camps ===
In addition to fruit, Aigner also took an interest in politics. He had been a member of the Bayerische Zentrumspartei and its successor the Bayerische Volkspartei (Bavarian People's Party) since 1916. In 1923 he attended a Nazi party meeting out of curiosity, where he heard a speech by Adolf Hitler. This prompted him to take a clear stand against Nazism especially in his sermons. He was fined for mocking the SS uniform, for refusing to ring his church bells in honor of Adolf Hitler and other infringements and in January 1937 Aigner was demoted to a post at Hohenbercha, Kranzberg, near Freising.

The assassination attempt on Adolf Hitler and several of the leading Nazis undertaken by Georg Elser on 8 November 1939 led Aigner to speak on the Fifth Commandment ("Thou shalt not kill") during a religious studies class he was giving on 9 November. During this, he said "I do not know if what the assassin had in mind was a sin. [Had Eisner succeeded], perhaps a million people would have been saved." This was reported to Münsterer, the Nazi party leader of Hohenkammer on 12 November. On 22 November Aigner was arrested and jailed in Freising.

He was charged with violation of Section 2 of the Nazi Treachery Act of 20 December 1934. On 7 May 1940, Aigner received a prison sentence and was taken to the Stadelheim prison. On his release he was transferred to the concentration camp at Sachsenhausen. Here he nearly died of pneumonia, and Aigner supposedly said: "I won't be doing you the favor of dying up here in Prussia".

On 3 October 1941 Aigner was moved to Dachau concentration camp as prisoner number 27,788 where he was placed in a block reserved for priests. In Dachau, he undertook his forced labor mainly in agriculture, following a program set up by Heinrich Himmler, who had taken a diploma in farming as a young man. Between two barracks he planted apple trees, and he even succeeded in breeding new varieties which he named KZ-1, KZ-2, KZ-3 and KZ-4, though by 2016 only KZ-3 (later named the Kobinian Apple in his honor) was still in existence. The saplings were smuggled out of the camp by a young novice nun, who visited the plantations in order to collect fruit and vegetables for a local orphanage.

On the night of 26 to 27 April 1945, as the Second World War was drawing to a close, Aigner together with about 10,000 other prisoners were forced to embark upon a death-march towards South Tyrol. On 28 April they arrived at Aufkirchen at Lake Starnberg, where Aigner was able to escape and hide in the monastery. The war was over for him.

== Aigner as pomologist ==
After the war, Aigner returned to his duties as a pastor in his community of Hohenbercha. There he devoted himself once more to his great passion, apples. Aigner obtained as many varieties as he could and embarked upon his great project of painting apples (and some pears): in total, paintings of 649 varieties of apple and 289 varieties of pear have survived and are now held in the Historical Archive of the Technical University of Munich.

Aigner first prepared a large postcard-sized piece of firm paper and after drawing the outlines in pencil would then work in watercolor, gouache or colored pencil. Most of his paintings were on a scale of 1:1 but this was not always the case when larger varieties were depicted. The paintings show two views of each specimen depicted side by side, the upper and the under-side of the fruit. However, contrary to established pomological practice Aigner did not offer a cross-sectional drawing of the core. Given his interest it was likely he would have seen examples of scientific studies, but he appears to have chosen to produce images to assist his teaching practice rather than to undertake any rigorous scientific study. Nevertheless his collection still offers a valuable reference resource today.

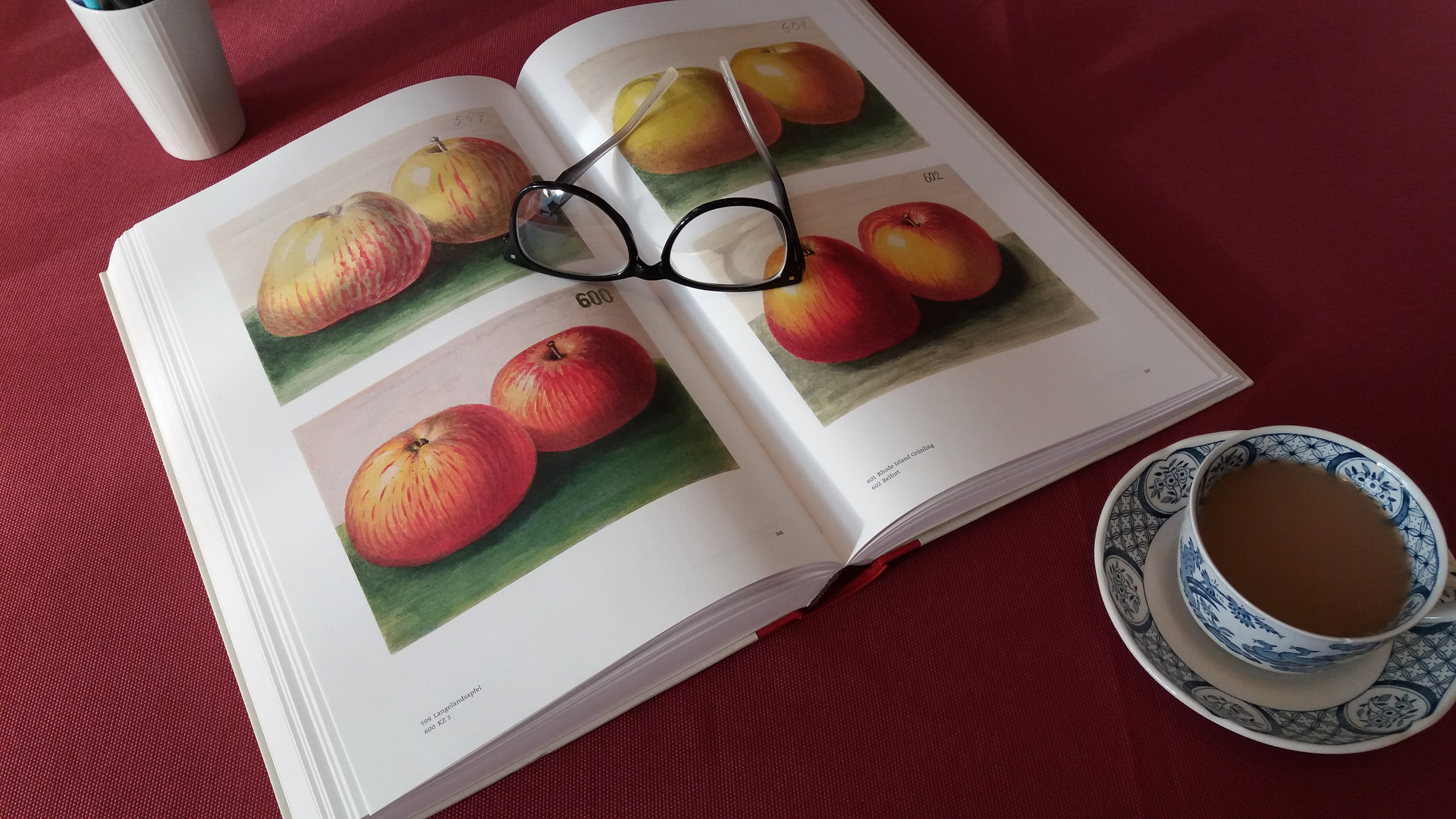
A reader enjoying the catalog of apple paintings by Korbinian Aigner. Published by Matthes & Seitz, Berlin 2013 ISBN 978-3-88221-051-4. On view (bottom left) is number 600, the KZ 3 or Korbinian Apple.

His obsession with apples led to criticism from his superiors who called him "more of a pomologist than a priest". Many of the varieties he painted have since disappeared from cultivation.

== Documenta 13 ==
Aigner achieved curious and unexpected fame after his death when his paintings were exhibited as part of the 2012 Kassel Documenta 13 contemporary art exhibition. His works were presented as an example of conceptual art in the Fridericianum, Kassel and reached wide audiences for the first time. In 2013 a complete catalog of his paintings was published in one volume by Matthes & Seitz, Berlin.

In October 1945 he was elected state chairman of the Bavarian State Horticultural Association and held this position for five years.

In September 1966 he fell ill with severe pneumonia and on 5 October 1966 died at the age of 81 in Freising Hospital. He found his final resting place at the cemetery in Hohenbercha.

== Honors ==
Korbinian Aigner was awarded the Bavarian Order of Merit and the Bavarian State Medal in gold. In 1985 the apple variety KZ-3 (number 600 in his catalog) was officially named the Korbinian Apple in celebration of Aigner's 100th birthday. On 28 June 2010 the Erding District Council voted to rename the Gymnasium Erding II in honor of Aigner.

== Literature ==
- Apfelpfarrer erntet den Dank der Obstbauern. Korbinian Aigner ist einer der bekanntesten bayerischen Obstzüchter.“ Süddeutsche Zeitung No. 224 from 18 September 1958, 11.
- Der „Apfelpfarrer“ Korbinian Aigner: die Galerie im Münchener Rathaus zeigte das Lebenswerk dieses „Pomologen“ und ehemaligen Präfekten in Scheyern (1912/16). In: Der Scheyrer Turm 49 (1992), pp. 15-16.
- Brenner, Peter, Korbinian Aigner: Ein bayerischer Pfarrer zwischen Kirche, Obstgarten und Konzentrationslager. Bauer-Verlag 2016. ISBN 978-3-95551-017-6
- Chaussy, Ulrich: Die Poesie der Landwirtschaft: das Leben des Apfelpfarrers Korbinian Aigner. München (Bayerischer Rundfunk, Land und Leute) 1994. 17 pp.
- Cordes, Gesche, Mürner, Christian: Äpfel: Anleitung zum Umgang mit einer Delikatesse, der Apfelpfarrer Korbinian Aigner. Europäische Verlagsanstalt, Hamburg 2002
- Niedermayer, Hans: Der Apfelpfarrer Korbinian Aigner: Dom-Gymnasiast, Seelsorger, Pomologe, KZ-Häftling. In: Jahresbericht (Dom-Gymnasium Freising) 1996/97, 8-30.
- Schalansky, Judith, Ed., with a foreword by Julia Voss. Korbinian Aigner: Äpfel und Birnen. Das Gesamtwerk. Pp. 5-21. Berlin: Matthes & Seitz 2013. ISBN 978-3-88221-051-4
