= Isen (river) =

River in Germany

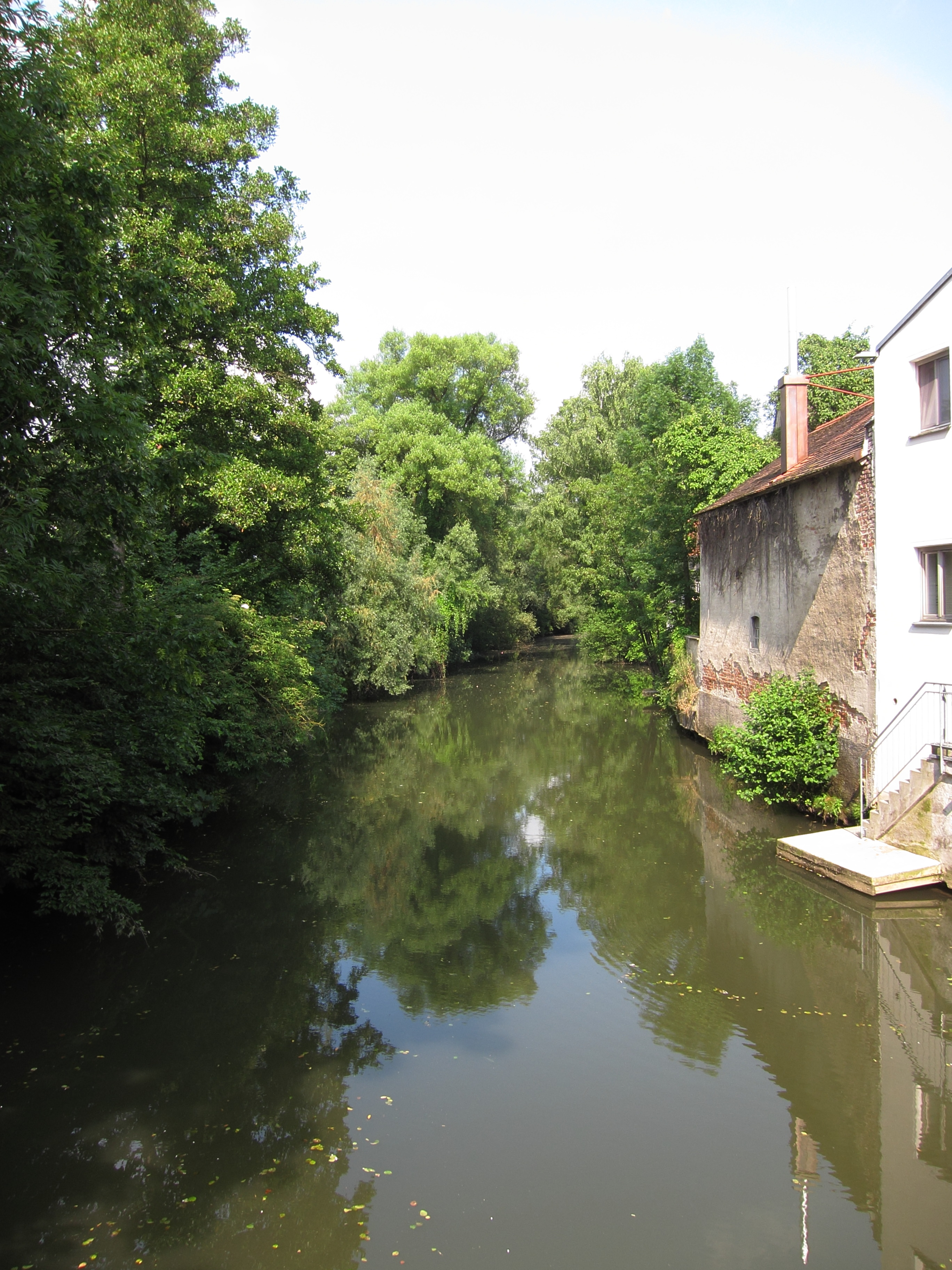
- The Isen in Dorfen

Location
- Country: Germany
- State: Bavaria
- Reference no.: DE: 1838

Physical characteristics
- Source
  - location: near Maitenbeth
  - coordinates: 48°10′09″N 12°05′28″E
  - elevation: ca. 622 m above sea level (NN)
- Mouth
  - location: opposite Neuötting into the Inn
  - coordinates: 48°15′02″N 12°40′20″E
  - elevation: rd. 371 m above sea level (NN)
- Length: 81.0 km (50.3 mi)
- Basin size: 586 km^{2} (226 sq mi)

Basin features
- Progression: Inn→ Danube→ Black Sea
- Landmarks: Small towns: Dorfen, Mühldorf

The Isen (German pronunciation: [ˈiːzn̩]) is a small river in southeast Upper Bavaria, Germany, with a length of about 81 kilometres. The Isen rises near Lacken (in the municipality of Maitenbeth, district of Mühldorf am Inn) and flows through one of the most unspoiled regions of Altbayern: the Isen Valley.

The Isen has its source in the district of Mühldorf and flows initially into the district of Erding along the villages of Isen, Lengdorf and Dorfen, then returns again to Mühldorf district coursing through (Schwindegg, Ampfing, Mettenheim, Mühldorf am Inn and Erharting). Finally it flows into the Inn in the district of Altötting, municipality Winhöring, opposite Neuötting.

The mouth of the Isen where it discharges into the Inn was moved further west, between the villages of Kronberg and Unterau in the municipality of Winhöring in the 19th century during the building of the München–Mühldorf–Simbach railway line. Its original mouth was near the village of Kager. Even today a few marshy spots in the fields and meadows are remnants of the old course of the Isen.

The Isen Valley, with its tributaries, is a Special Area of Conservation (Fauna-Flora-Habitat-Richtlinie or FFH) that is threatened by the construction of the A 94 motorway.

The water quality of the Isen is moderately to critically polluted. Its tributaries are the Lappach, Kagnbach and Goldach.

== Sources ==
- Rudolf Angermeier, Adolf Kunzmann: Isengau. Pannonia-Verlag, Freilassing 1978.

== TV Documentaries ==
- Die Isen. TV series Topographie by Dieter Wieland. Bayerischer Rundfunk 1981.
- Mein Isental. Nature documentary by Jan Haft. Bayerisches Fernsehen 2007. 45 min.
