= Martin Bayerstorfer =

German politician

Martin Bayerstorfer (born 28 May 1966 in Landshut) is a German politician of the Christian Social Union of Bavaria (CSU) and has been the Landrat (District Administrator) of the district of Erding since 1 May 2002.

== Early life and education ==
Bayerstorfer grew up on a farm in Kleinaign (municipality of Hohenpolding). His grandfather had been mayor and municipal clerk of Hohenpolding. He attended the Realschule in Taufkirchen (Vils). After agricultural vocational training and attending a technical school (Fachschule), Bayerstorfer received a scholarship to attend the Landvolkhochschule (rural adult education center) and then the Höhere Landbauschule (agricultural college) in Rotthalmünster, where he passed the master craftsman examination (Meisterprüfung). He has since worked as an independent farmer in Hohenpolding.

Martin Bayerstorfer is married and has three children.

== Political career ==
In 1990, at the age of 23, Bayerstorfer was elected honorary First Mayor of the municipality of Hohenpolding, making him Germany's youngest mayor at the time. He held this office until 2002. From 1993 to 2001, he was Deputy CSU District Chairman in Erding. In May 1996, he became a member of the Erding District Council (Kreistag).

From May 1996 to September 1998, Bayerstorfer was a member of the Bavarian State Parliament (Landtag), having entered as a successor on the Upper Bavaria list. There, he served on the Petitions Committee and the Committee for Food, Agriculture, and Forestry. He was not re-elected to the Landtag in 1998 via the list. Since then, Bayerstorfer has primarily seen himself as a local politician.

On 5 April 2001, Bayerstorfer was elected CSU District Chairman for Erding, an office he still holds. A year later, in the 2002 local elections, he was elected District Administrator (Landrat) of Erding with 67.9% of the vote in the first round. He was re-elected in 2008 (62.19%) and 2014 (54.5%), both in the first round. In the 2020 local elections,

As District Administrator, his work has focused on areas such as maintaining the district hospitals in municipal ownership, expanding educational facilities, and continuing the Erding geothermal project, which supplies, among others, the Therme Erding.

From 2007 to 2021, Bayerstorfer was also Deputy District Chairman of the CSU Upper Bavaria. In October 2010, he was elected President of the Association of Bavarian Singing and Music Schools (Verband Bayerischer Sing- und Musikschulen e.V., VBSM). He is also chairman of Lebenshilfe Erding.

== Controversies and criticism ==
Throughout his tenure, Martin Bayerstorfer has faced public criticism and controversy, particularly concerning his refugee and asylum policies, as well as his understanding of his official duties.

=== Refugee and asylum policy ===
==== Rhetoric and public statements ====
Bayerstorfer's public statements on refugees and asylum have repeatedly caused outrage:

- In November 2015, commenting on the case of an asylum seeker from Ghana without a passport, he stated: "Clear case: deprivation of liberty." (German: "Klarer Fall: Freiheitsentzug.") This was based solely on case files without considering personal circumstances.
- Also in November 2015, on the ZDF talk show Maybrit Illner, he demanded: "Refugees who do not cooperate with the authorities: they should be put in prison." (German: "Flüchtlinge, die nicht mit den Behörden kooperieren: Die gehörten ins Gefängnis.")
- In June 2022, during a speech at the District Farmers' Day (Kreisbauerntag), he compared bureaucratic requirements for livestock identification with an alleged lack of interest in identifying arriving refugees: "Animals need two ear tags, all bureaucracy, only with people we don't care where they come from!" (German: "Die Tiere brauchen zwei Ohrenmarkerl, lauter Bürokratie, nur bei den Menschen interessiert es uns nicht, woher die kommen!") This statement was criticized as "outrageous and historically forgetful."
- In 2015, he justified a preference for providing benefits in kind rather than cash to asylum seekers by suggesting: "...because they would buy stereos with their money, not clothes." (German: "...weil die mit ihrem Geld Stereoanlagen kaufen würden und keine Kleidung.")
- Regarding reasons for flight, he remarked in November 2015 while reviewing refugee files: "The young lads run off, and many women and children are left behind. Is it really that bad there if I expect my relatives to endure that?" (German: "Die jungen Burschen hauen ab, und viele Kinder und Frauen werden zurückgelassen. Ist es dann wirklich so schlimm dort, wenn ich den Angehörigen das zumute?")
- In June 2024, Bayerstorfer criticized that there was "...almost no difference anymore whether I am in the country rightfully, i.e., recognized, or merely tolerated with a negative [asylum] decision." He suggested acting like Denmark: "No more benefits. You get food, drink, logically clothes too, of course. Everything you need to live, but no money." He also demanded that "...according to actual existing law with the Schengen external borders, no one should be able to arrive here directly anymore."

==== "Kommunalpass" (Municipal Pass) ====
In 2016, the Erding district, under Bayerstorfer's leadership, introduced a "Kommunalpass," a system unique in Bavaria and controversial, for asylum seekers. It provided social benefits primarily as benefits in kind via a chip card instead of cash payments. The system was linked to the financial service provider Wirecard, which later became embroiled in a major financial scandal. The Kommunalpass had to be discontinued in 2021 because the district's service provider, Sodexo, had used Wirecard's services.

==== Practices of the Erding Immigration Office (Ausländerbehörde) ====
The Immigration Office of the Erding district has been criticized for years for its particularly restrictive practices, especially concerning work permits for "tolerated" individuals (Geduldete). According to official information from the Erding District Office dated 20 September 2023, individuals with a Duldung (toleration permit, § 60a Abs. 2 Satz 1 AufenthG) can be granted a work permit with the approval of the Federal Employment Agency. However, actual practice appears to contradict this. Media reports indicate that work permit applications for tolerated individuals in Erding were rejected at a rate of up to 80–95%, while in the neighboring district of Munich, over 90% were approved. Several entrepreneurs in the Erding district publicly complained that work permits for suitable applicants were denied.

=== Treatment of opposition and democratic procedures ===
In 2023, Bayerstorfer received an official reprimand from the Government of Upper Bavaria (Regierung von Oberbayern) as the supervisory authority. He was accused of repeatedly failing to place motions from the Green Party faction on the agenda for deliberation in the district council. The Government of Upper Bavaria clarified that such actions were unlawful, as motions must be presented to the district council for a decision even if there are doubts about jurisdiction.

=== Conflict with the Catholic Women's Social Service (SkF) ===
In 2017, a public conflict arose between District Administrator Bayerstorfer and the Catholic Women's Social Service (Sozialdienst katholischer Frauen, SkF) Erding, which operates the local women's shelter. Bayerstorfer accused the SkF of a lack of transparency in the use of public funds and publicly attacked the organization. Representatives of the SkF and local politicians criticized Bayerstorfer's actions as "shameful" and "insulting," especially given the organization's important work in protecting women from violence.

=== Legal dispute with a district council member ===
In 2019, Bayerstorfer took legal action against Green Party district council member Stephan Glaubitz. He accused Glaubitz of making false factual claims in a press release about the work of the Immigration Office, particularly concerning the restrictive granting of work permits. The amount in dispute was set at over €91,000, which Glaubitz's lawyer described as an attempt to "economically ruin" the opposition politician.

== Awards and honours ==
- 2007: Gold Pin of Honour of the District Hunting Association (Ehrennadel in Gold des Kreisjagdverbandes)
- 2013: Municipal Medal of Merit in Silver (Kommunale Verdienstmedaille in Silber)

== See also ==
- List of Bavarian Christian Social Union politicians
