= Lappach =

River in Germany

- The Lappach in Parschalling (part of Dorfen)

Location
- Country: Germany
- State: Bavaria

Physical characteristics
- Mouth
  - location: Isen
  - coordinates: 48.2680°N 12.1264°E
- Length: 10.9 km (6.8 mi)

Basin features
- Progression: Isen→ Inn→ Danube→ Black Sea

The Lappach is a river in Bavaria, Germany. It flows into the Isen near Dorfen.

== See also ==
- List of rivers of Bavaria
