= Hedwig Preysing =

- Hedwig Maria Ida Countess von Preysing-Lichtenegg-Moos
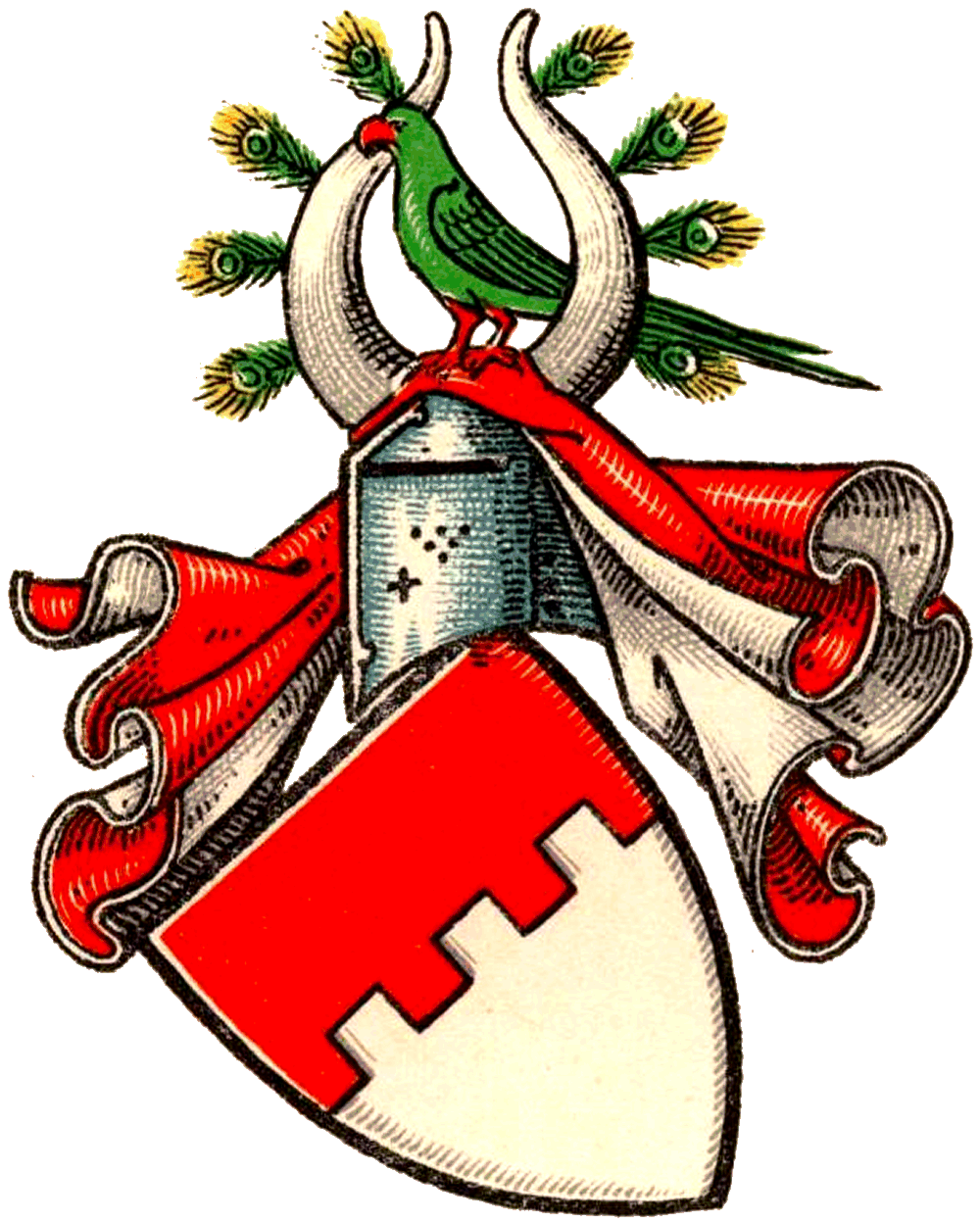
- Coat of arms of the von Preysing family
- Born: December 16, 1849; Bratislava
- Died: September 4, 1938 (aged 88)
- Burial place: Eching, Landkreis Landshut, Bavaria, Germany
- Known for: Activism
- Title: Countess
- Movement: Bavarian State Association of the Catholic German Women's League
- Spouse(s): Johann Kaspar, Count of Preysing-Lichtenegg-Moos
- Children: 11 Cardinal Konrad Count of Preysing
- Parents: George Wilhelm Edler, Baron of Wolfsthal (father); Ida, née Countess of Fries (mother)

Hedwig von Preysing-Lichtenegg-Moos (December 16, 1849 – September 4, 1938) was the co-founder of the Bavarian State Association of the Catholic German Women's League and initiator of various social and charitable institutions.

== Life and work ==
Hedwig was born in Bratislava and was the fifth of twelve children by George Wilhelm Edler of Walpertskirchen, Baron of Wolfsthal, and his wife Ida, née Countess of Fries. In 1876, she married Johann Kaspar, Count of Preysing-Lichtenegg-Moos, with whom she had eleven children.

Their third son was Cardinal Konrad Count of Preysing. Other than raising her children with the help of private tutors, Hedwig, widowed since 1897, was active in social causes. She was particularly interested in the charitable institutions of the Catholic Women's League. She was a strong supporter of Ellen Ammann and a leading advocate for the concerns of both urban and rural women. Countess Preysing founded several branches of the Catholic Women's Association, primarily in Lower Bavaria, which in 1911 went on to merge and form the Bavarian State Association of the Catholic Women's League. Within the association, she initiated the establishment of milk kitchens, the opening of counseling centers for mothers with young children, and outpatient nursing stations run by the Third Order.

In Eching, Hedwig Preysing was honored with a women's memorial site.

== Sources ==
- Preysing-Lichtenegg-Moos, Hedwig Maria Ida Countess, in: Hugo Maier (ed.): Who's Who of Social Work, Freiburg/Breisgau 1998, pp. 480–481
- Preysing-Lichtenegg-Moos, Hedwig Maria Ida Countess von. In: Biographisch-Bibliographisches Kirchenlexikon (BBKL). Volume 22, Bautz, Nordhausen 2003, ISBN 3-88309-133-2, col. 1113–1117
- Maria Buczkowska: On the history of the Bavarian State Association of the Catholic Women's League with special consideration of its founders, Munich 1928
- Marianne Neboisa: Ellen Ammann, née Sundström 1870–1932, St. Ottilien 1992
