= Matzbach (Geislbach) =

River in Germany

Location
- Country: Germany
- State: Bavaria

Physical characteristics
- Mouth
  - location: Niedergleisbach, district of Lengdorf
  - coordinates: 48.2691°N 12.0576°E

Matzbach is a river of Bavaria, Germany. It is a left tributary of the Geislbach.

== See also ==
- List of rivers of Bavaria
