= Inning (disambiguation) =

Inning may refer to:

- Inning, a segment of a game in baseball and softball
  - Innings pitched, the number of innings a pitcher has completed
- Innings, a segment of a game in cricket and rounders
- Inning, land reclamation; innings, reclaimed land
- towns:
  - Inning am Ammersee, a town in Landkreis Starnberg in Bavaria, Germany
  - Inning am Holz, a town in Landkreis Erding in Bavaria, Germany
