= Neufahrn =

Neufahrn may refer to the following municipalities or parts of municipalities:

- Neufahrn bei Freising, in Upper Bavaria, Germany
- Neufahrn in Niederbayern, in Lower Bavaria, Germany
- Neufahrn (Egling), part of the municipality Egling, Upper Bavaria, Germany
- Neufahrn (Mettenheim), part of the municipality Mettenheim, Upper Bavaria, Germany
- Neufahrn (Schäftlarn), part of the municipality Schäftlarn, Upper Bavaria, Germany
- Neufahrn (Walpertskirchen), part of the municipality Walpertskirchen, Upper Bavaria, Germany
- Neufahrn (Neumarkt am Wallersee), part of the municipality Neumarkt am Wallersee, Austria
