= Strogen =

Strogen may refer to:

- 27706 Strogen, main-belt asteroid
- Strogen (river), a river of Bavaria, Germany, tributary of the Sempt
