= Steinkirchen (Verwaltungsgemeinschaft) =

- Verwaltungsgemeinschaft
- Location of Steinkirchen within Erding district
- Interactive map of Steinkirchen
- Location within Germany Location within Bavaria
- Coordinates: 48°22′N 12°05′E
- Country: Germany
- State: Bavaria
- Admin. region: Upper Bavaria
- District: Erding
- Seat: Steinkirchen
- Subdivisions: 4 municipalities

Area
  - Total: 74.44 km^{2} (28.74 sq mi)

Population (2025-12-31)
  - Total: 5,735
  - Density: 77.04/km^{2} (199.5/sq mi)
- Time zone: UTC+01:00 (CET)
  - Summer (DST): UTC+02:00 (CEST)
- Website: www.vg-steinkirchen.de

Steinkirchen is a Verwaltungsgemeinschaft (municipal association) in the district of Erding in Bavaria, Germany. Its seat is in Steinkirchen.

It consists of the following municipalities:

1. Hohenpolding
2. Inning am Holz
3. Kirchberg
4. Steinkirchen
