= Hörlkofen =

- Verwaltungsgemeinschaft
- Location of Hörlkofen within Erding district
- Interactive map of Hörlkofen
- Location within Germany Location within Bavaria
- Coordinates: 48°15′N 11°57′E
- Country: Germany
- State: Bavaria
- Admin. region: Upper Bavaria
- District: Erding
- Seat: Wörth
- Subdivisions: 2 municipalities

Area
  - Total: 39.5 km^{2} (15.3 sq mi)

Population (2025-12-31)
  - Total: 6,591
  - Density: 167/km^{2} (432/sq mi)
- Time zone: UTC+01:00 (CET)
  - Summer (DST): UTC+02:00 (CEST)
- Website: www.vg-hoerlkofen.de

Hörlkofen is a Verwaltungsgemeinschaft (municipal association) in the district of Erding in Bavaria, Germany. Its seat is in Wörth. It takes its name from the village Hörlkofen, part of the municipality Wörth.

It consists of the following municipalities:

1. Walpertskirchen
2. Wörth
