= Berglern =

- Municipality
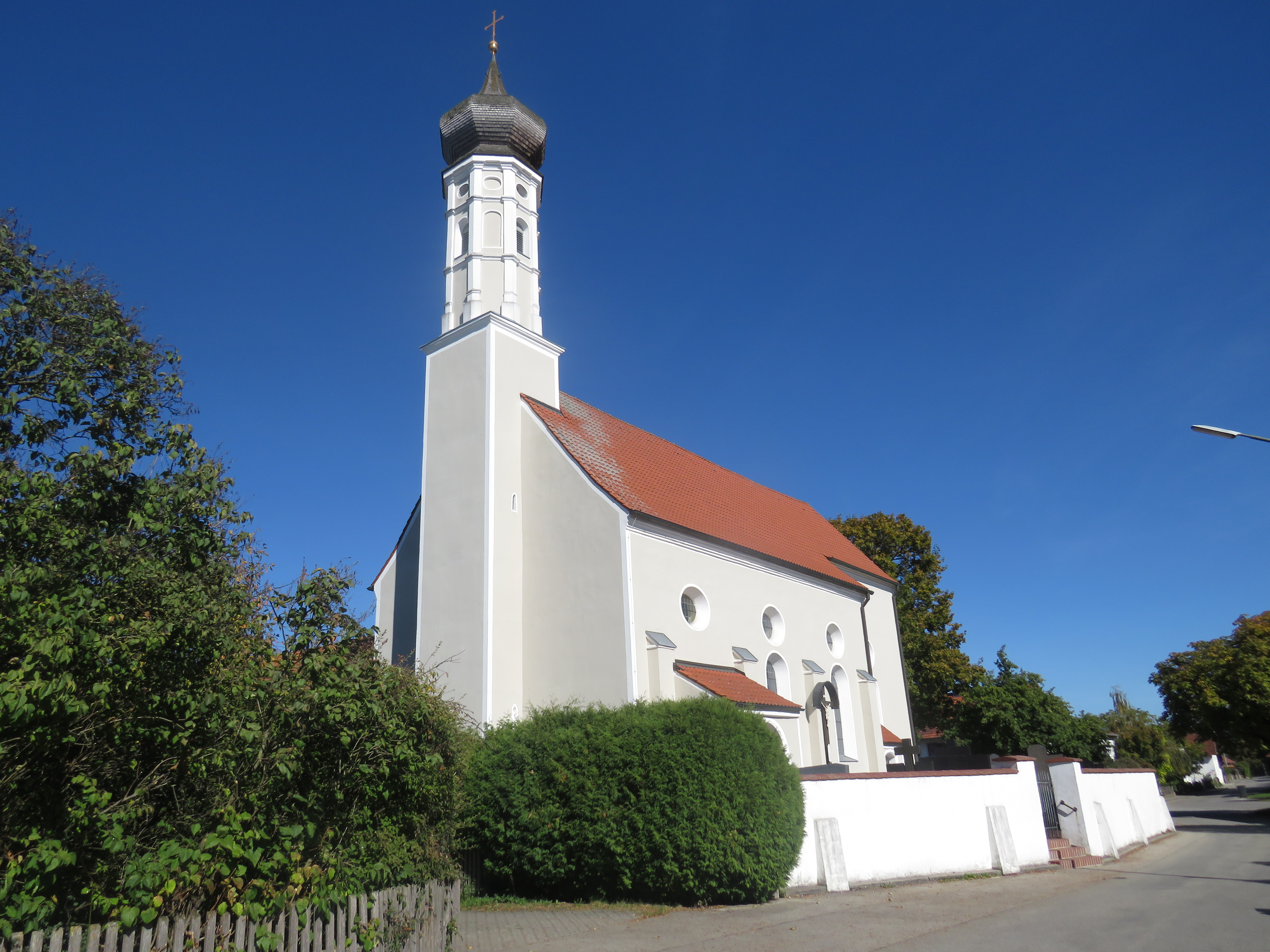
- Church of Saint Andrew in Niederlern

- Coat of arms

- Location of Berglern within Erding district
- Interactive map of Berglern
- Location within Germany Location within Bavaria
- Coordinates: 48°23′N 11°56′E
- Country: Germany
- State: Bavaria
- Admin. region: Oberbayern
- District: Erding
- Municipal assoc.: Wartenberg

Government
  - Mayor (2020–26): Anton Scherer

Area
  - Total: 19.89 km^{2} (7.68 sq mi)
- Elevation: 440 m (1,440 ft)

Population (2025-12-31)
  - Total: 2,915
  - Density: 146.6/km^{2} (379.6/sq mi)
- Time zone: UTC+01:00 (CET)
  - Summer (DST): UTC+02:00 (CEST)
- Postal codes: 85459
- Dialling codes: 08762
- Vehicle registration: ED
- Website: www.berglern.de

Berglern is a municipality in the district of Erding in Bavaria.
