= Pastetten =

- Municipality
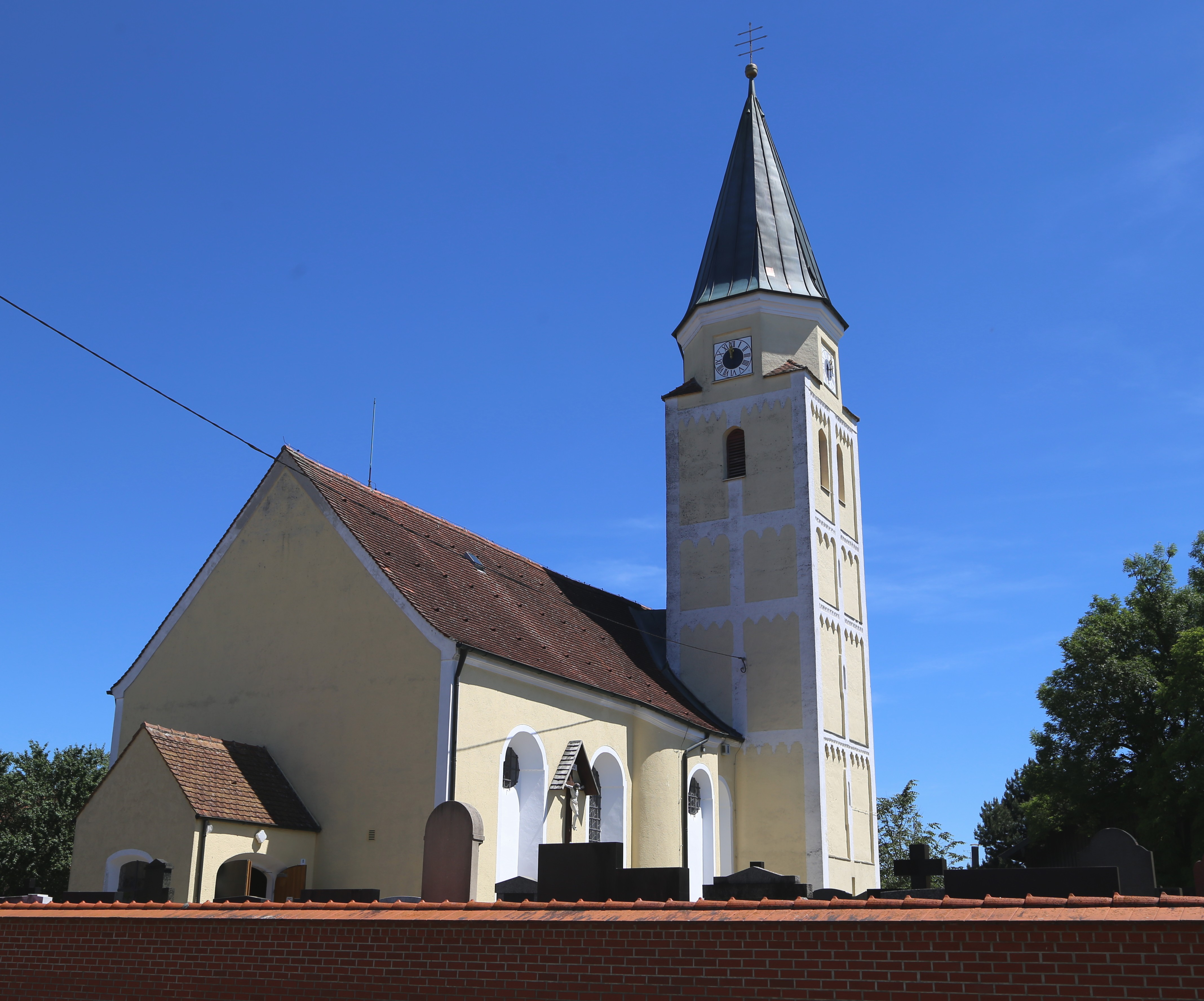
- Church of Saint Martin

- Coat of arms

- Location of Pastetten within Erding district
- Interactive map of Pastetten
- Location within Germany Location within Bavaria
- Coordinates: 48°12′N 11°57′E
- Country: Germany
- State: Bavaria
- Admin. region: Oberbayern
- District: Erding
- Municipal assoc.: Pastetten

Government
  - Mayor (2020–26): Peter Deischl

Area
  - Total: 22.08 km^{2} (8.53 sq mi)
- Elevation: 508–558 m (1,667–1,831 ft)

Population (2025-12-31)
  - Total: 2,826
  - Density: 128.0/km^{2} (331.5/sq mi)
- Time zone: UTC+01:00 (CET)
  - Summer (DST): UTC+02:00 (CEST)
- Postal codes: 85669
- Dialling codes: 08124
- Vehicle registration: ED
- Website: www.pastetten.de

Pastetten (German pronunciation: [paˈʃtɛtn̩]) is a municipality in the district of Erding in Bavaria in Germany. It is a rural municipality in the south of the district. The town was founded about one thousand years ago along the road from Swabia to Erding.

== History ==
Pastetten is documented for the first time in 957 as "Poustetin" (late Povsteti), when Bishop Abraham of Vasallen and Earl Altuom exchanged real estate near Pastetten and Matzling. About 1483 the Count of Preysing received the castle and its judicial seat. The document refers to a tavern, and a smithy in the town. A tax description of 1671 names Hans Poegl as a market officer and states that the monasteries owned properties in Pastetten. The monastic properties were secularised in 1682.

The church dedicated to Saint Martin is a late Gothic brick building, established around 1400 in place of a far older and smaller church.
