= Eitting =

- Municipality
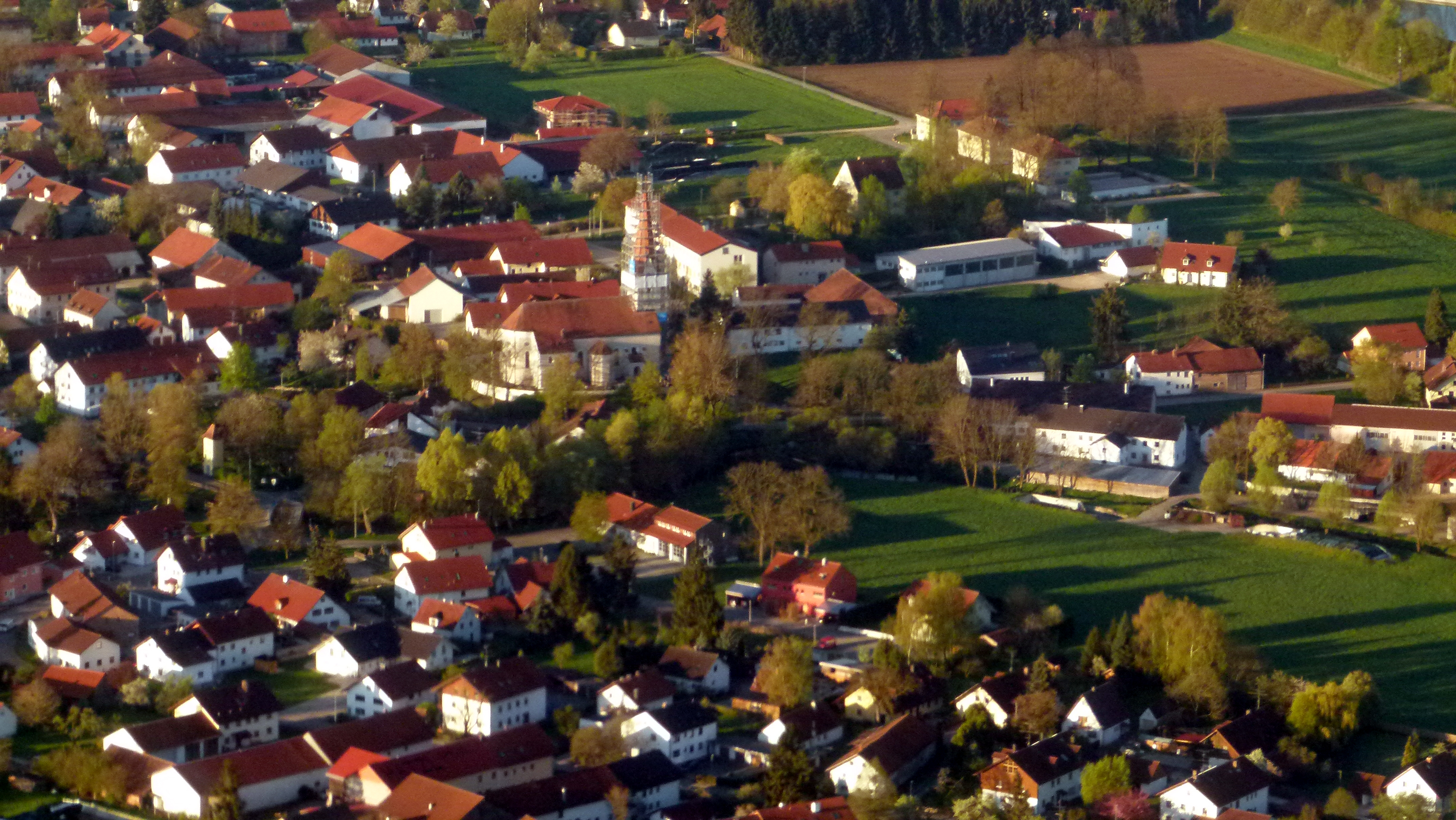
- Aerial view

- Coat of arms

- Location of Eitting within Erding district
- Interactive map of Eitting
- Location within Germany Location within Bavaria
- Coordinates: 48°22′N 11°54′E
- Country: Germany
- State: Bavaria
- Admin. region: Oberbayern
- District: Erding
- Municipal assoc.: Oberding
- Subdivisions: 4 Ortsteile

Government
  - Mayor (2020–26): Reinhard Huber

Area
  - Total: 35.63 km^{2} (13.76 sq mi)
- Elevation: 449 m (1,473 ft)

Population (2025-12-31)
  - Total: 3,155
  - Density: 88.55/km^{2} (229.3/sq mi)
- Time zone: UTC+01:00 (CET)
  - Summer (DST): UTC+02:00 (CEST)
- Postal codes: 85462
- Dialling codes: 0 81 22
- Vehicle registration: ED
- Website: www.eitting.de

Eitting (German pronunciation: [ˈaɪtɪŋ]) is a municipality in the district of Erding in Bavaria in Germany.
