= Oberding =

- Municipality
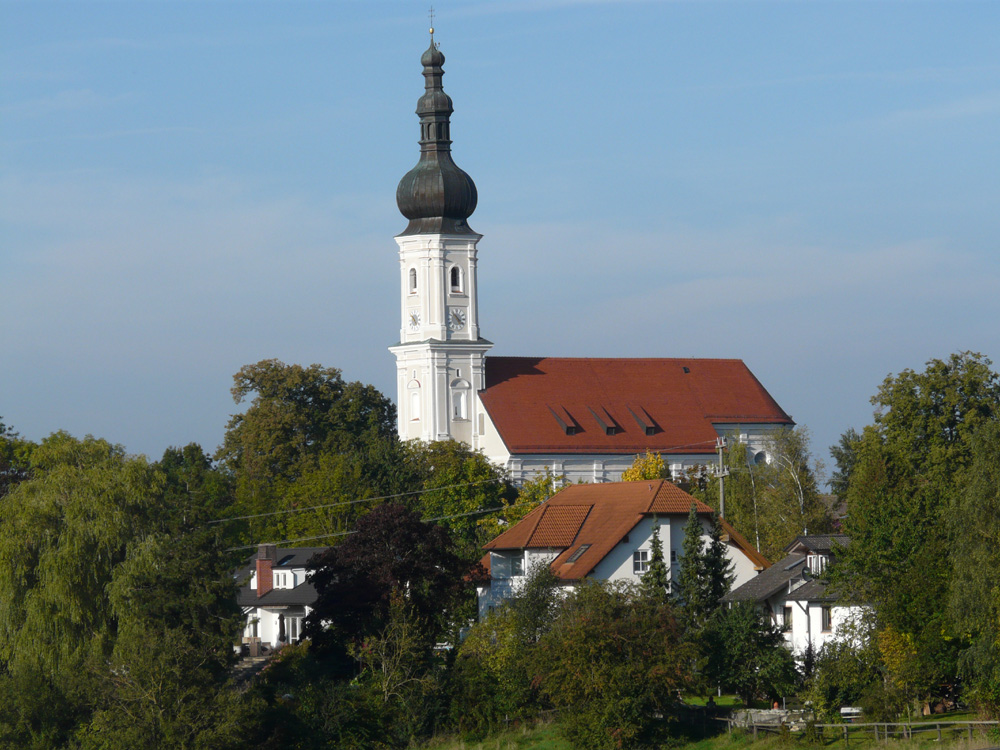
- Saint John the Baptist Church

- Coat of arms

- Location of Oberding within Erding district
- Interactive map of Oberding
- Location within Germany Location within Bavaria
- Coordinates: 48°19′N 11°51′E
- Country: Germany
- State: Bavaria
- Admin. region: Oberbayern
- District: Erding
- Municipal assoc.: Oberding

Government
  - Mayor (2020–26): Bernhard Mücke

Area
  - Total: 64.70 km^{2} (24.98 sq mi)
- Elevation: 468 m (1,535 ft)

Population (2025-12-31)
  - Total: 6,355
  - Density: 98.22/km^{2} (254.4/sq mi)
- Time zone: UTC+01:00 (CET)
  - Summer (DST): UTC+02:00 (CEST)
- Postal codes: 85445
- Dialling codes: 08122
- Vehicle registration: ED
- Website: www.oberding.de

Oberding (German: Oberding, Bavarian: Obading) is a municipality in the district of Erding in Upper Bavaria in Germany, and member of the administrative community of the same name. Almost half of the area of Munich Airport, including both terminals, falls within the municipal bounds.

== Geography ==
Oberding is located in the Munich area in the middle of Erdinger Moos between the rivers Sempt and village. The village is located about 6 km north-west of the county Erding, 17 km south of Freising and 36 km from the state capital Munich in the immediate vicinity of the Munich Airport.

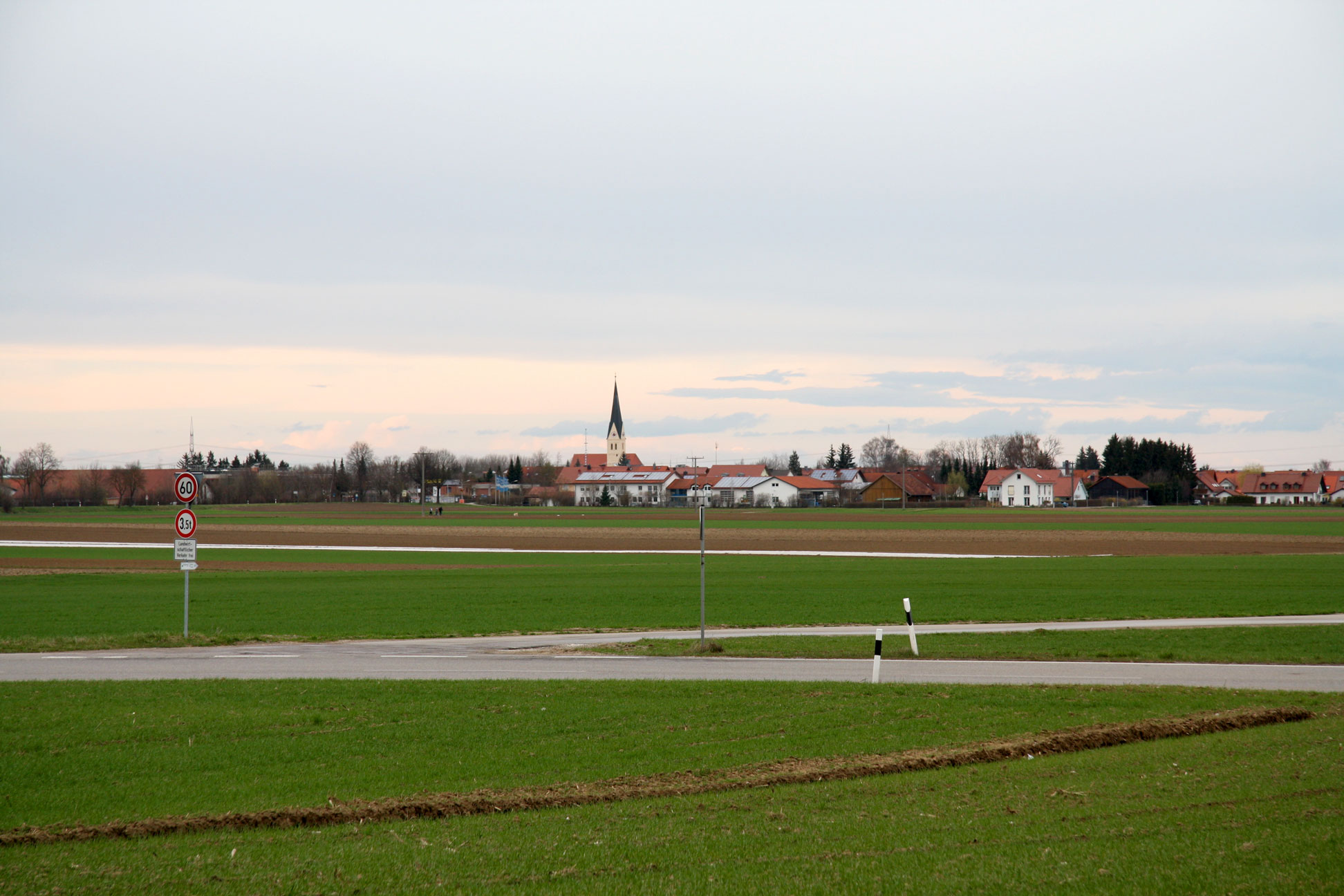
Town of Oberding

=== Community structure ===
==== Districts ====
- Notzing
- Oberding

==== Other parts of municipalities ====
- Aufkirchen
- Niederding
- Notzingermoos
- Oberdingermoos
- Schwaig
- Schwaigermoos

For the construction of the Munich Airport landing paths in 1992, the residents of Franz home were partially displaced by Schwaigermoos. Much of the current airport site, including the terminals, is located in the municipality. For the planned construction of the third take-off and landing strip another partial removal of Schwaigermoss is necessary.

=== Waters ===
The Middle-Isar-channel and the river village, both flow in roughly a north-south direction.

== History ==
The region was part of the Electorate Bavaria, forming a closed Hofmark of cathedrals of Bishopric of Freising, with the Bishopric in 1803 deleted. In the course of administrative reform, the Bavaria was given the Community Edict of 1818 by the church.

=== Population Development ===
The region population in 1970 was 3,111, in 1987 3,229 and in 2000 4,692.

== Policy ==
The Mayor of Oberding is Bernhard Mücke, in office since 2014 and re-elected in 2020.

The municipal tax revenue in 1999 amounted to the equivalent of €6166 € T, which amounted to the business tax receipts (net) 3458 T converted.

=== Coat of arms and flag ===
The coat of arms established on 25 May 1950 is "in blue at an angle on the left posed silver scythe." Besides the coat of arms, the town flag are the colors blue, white and blue.

== Economy and Infrastructure ==
=== Economy, agriculture and forestry ===
The largest contribution to the municipality is the Munich Airport Franz Josef Strauss, which opened in 1992, it is the most important economic factor; also in the district is the power station Santa Maria on the Middle-Isar-channel.

The official 1998 statistics:

- agriculture and forestry 22
- manufacturing 441
- trade and transport 436
- supported by social insurance 467

Also, in 1999 there were 121 agricultural holdings with a utilized agricultural area of 3,619 ha, of which 3,033 ha is arable land.

=== Education ===
In 1999, there were the following facilities:

- Kindergarten: few kindergartens with 177 children
- Elementary Schools: 2 with 27 teachers and 451 students

== Attractions ==
- Catholic parish church of St. John the Baptist in Aufkirchen, 1725–30
- Catholic parish church of St. Martin in Niederding, 1757–60
- Catholic Church in St. Korbinian Schwaig, 1903–05
- Catholic Church in St. Nikolaus in Notzing
- Catholic Church of St. George branch in Upper thing, 1701/03, tower from the 14th century
- Kath Daughter church of St. Nicholas in Notzing, 2nd half of the 15th century, saddleback tower of the 13th or 14th century
- Castle Notzing, former water castle, 14th century
