= Wartenberg (Verwaltungsgemeinschaft) =

- Verwaltungsgemeinschaft
- Location of Wartenberg within Erding district
- Interactive map of Wartenberg
- Location within Germany Location within Bavaria
- Coordinates: 48°24′N 11°59′E
- Country: Germany
- State: Bavaria
- Admin. region: Upper Bavaria
- District: Erding
- Seat: Wartenberg
- Subdivisions: 3 municipalities

Area
  - Total: 65.26 km^{2} (25.20 sq mi)

Population (2025-12-31)
  - Total: 11,296
  - Density: 173.1/km^{2} (448.3/sq mi)
- Time zone: UTC+01:00 (CET)
  - Summer (DST): UTC+02:00 (CEST)
- Website: www.vg-wartenberg.de

Wartenberg is a Verwaltungsgemeinschaft (municipal association) in the district of Erding in Bavaria, Germany. Its seat is in Wartenberg.

It consists of the following municipalities:

1. Berglern
2. Langenpreising
3. Wartenberg
