= Oberneuching =

Verwaltungsgemeinschaft in Bavaria, Germany

- Verwaltungsgemeinschaft
- Location of Oberneuching within Erding district
- Interactive map of Oberneuching
- Location within Germany Location within Bavaria
- Coordinates: 48°14′N 11°51′E
- Country: Germany
- State: Bavaria
- Admin. region: Upper Bavaria
- District: Erding
- Seat: Neuching
- Subdivisions: 2 municipalities

Area
  - Total: 29.95 km^{2} (11.56 sq mi)

Population (2025-12-31)
  - Total: 4,759
  - Density: 158.9/km^{2} (411.5/sq mi)
- Time zone: UTC+01:00 (CET)
  - Summer (DST): UTC+02:00 (CEST)
- Website: www.vg-oberneuching.de

Oberneuching is a Verwaltungsgemeinschaft (municipal association) in the district of Erding in Bavaria, Germany. Its seat is in Neuching. It takes its name from the village Oberneuching, part of the municipality Neuching.

It consists of the following municipalities:

1. Neuching
2. Ottenhofen
