= Wörth, Upper Bavaria =

Wörth
- Municipality
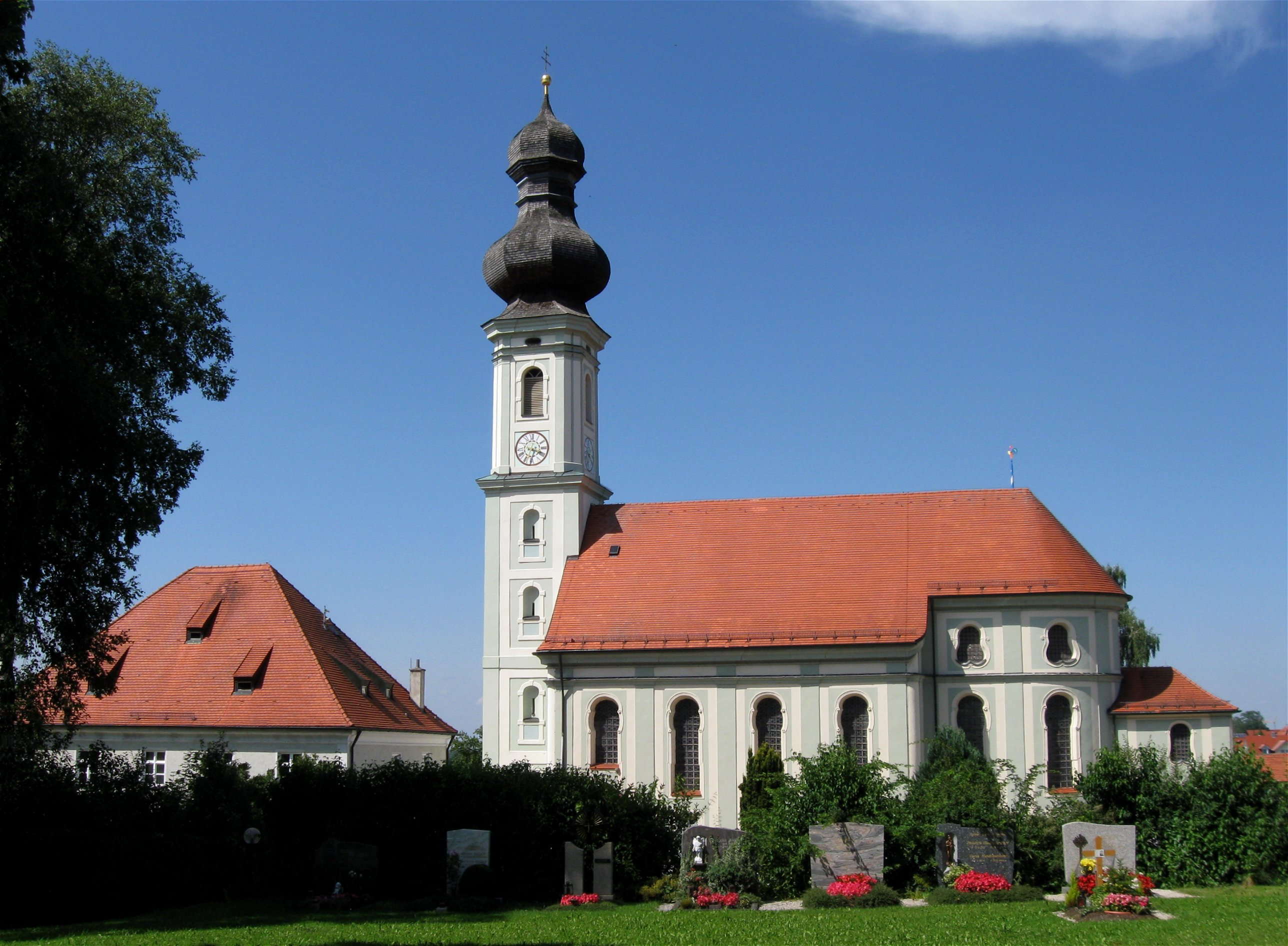
- Church of Saint Peter

- Coat of arms

- Location of Wörth within Erding district
- Interactive map of Wörth
- Location within Germany Location within Bavaria
- Coordinates: 48°14′N 11°54′E
- Country: Germany
- State: Bavaria
- Admin. region: Oberbayern
- District: Erding
- Municipal assoc.: Hörlkofen

Government
  - Mayor (2020–26): Thomas Gneißl

Area
  - Total: 21.05 km^{2} (8.13 sq mi)
- Elevation: 480–520 m (1,570–1,710 ft)

Population (2025-12-31)
  - Total: 4,416
  - Density: 209.8/km^{2} (543.3/sq mi)
- Time zone: UTC+01:00 (CET)
  - Summer (DST): UTC+02:00 (CEST)
- Postal codes: 85457
- Dialling codes: 08123, 08122
- Vehicle registration: ED
- Website: www.vg-hoerlkofen.de

Wörth (German pronunciation: [vœʁt]) is a municipality in the district of Erding in Bavaria in Germany.
