= Oberding (Verwaltungsgemeinschaft) =

- Verwaltungsgemeinschaft
- Location of Oberding within Erding district
- Interactive map of Oberding
- Location within Germany Location within Bavaria
- Coordinates: 48°19′N 11°51′E
- Country: Germany
- State: Bavaria
- Admin. region: Upper Bavaria
- District: Erding
- Seat: Oberding
- Subdivisions: 2 municipalities

Area
  - Total: 100.35 km^{2} (38.75 sq mi)

Population (2025-12-31)
  - Total: 9,510
  - Density: 94.8/km^{2} (245/sq mi)
- Time zone: UTC+01:00 (CET)
  - Summer (DST): UTC+02:00 (CEST)
- Website: www.vg-oberding.de

Oberding is a Verwaltungsgemeinschaft (municipal association) in the district of Erding in Bavaria, Germany. Its seat is in Oberding.

It consists of the following municipalities:

1. Eitting
2. Oberding
