= Langenpreising =

- Municipality
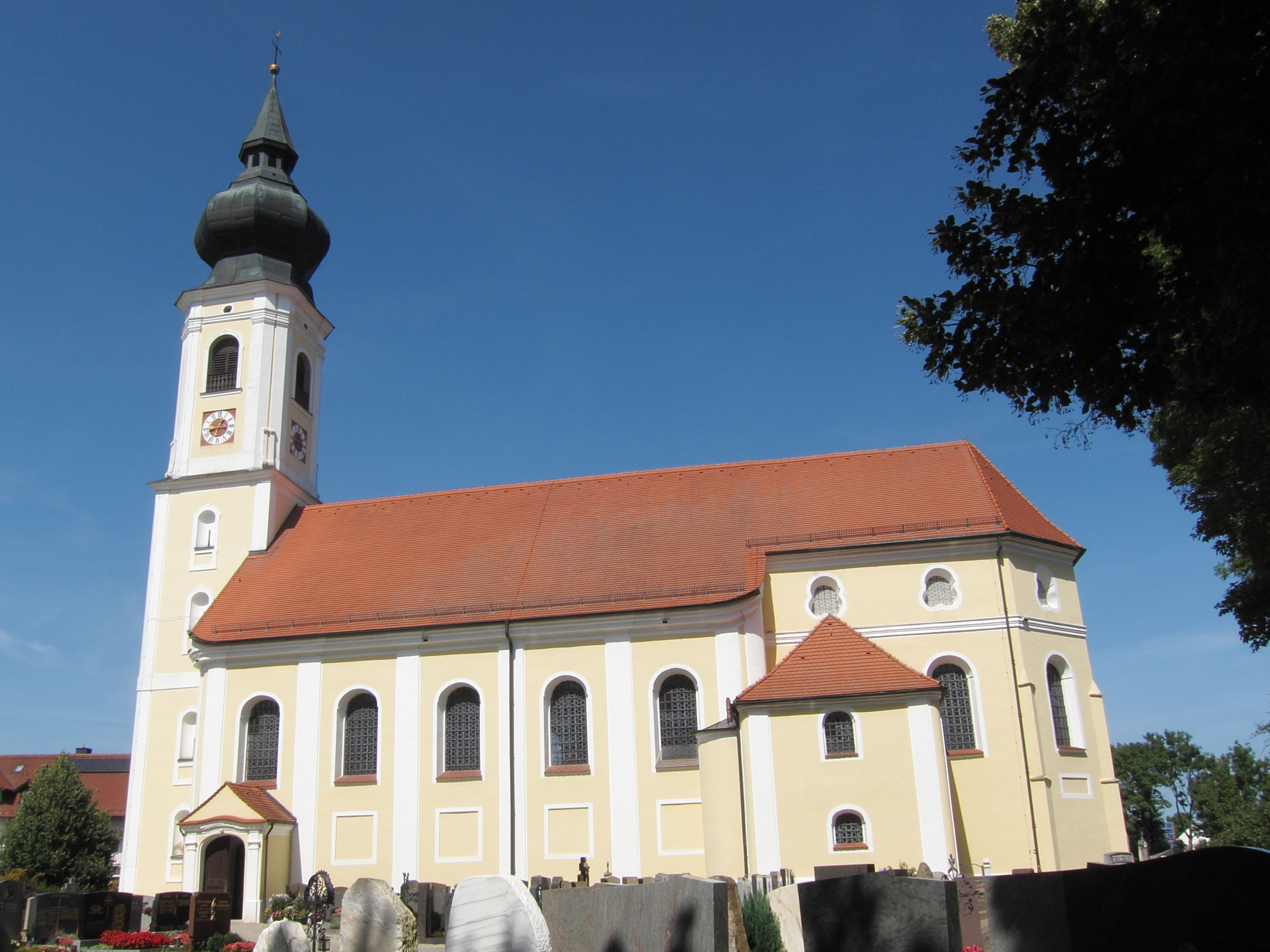
- Church of Saint Martin

- Coat of arms

- Location of Langenpreising within Erding district
- Interactive map of Langenpreising
- Location within Germany Location within Bavaria
- Coordinates: 48°26′N 11°58′E
- Country: Germany
- State: Bavaria
- Admin. region: Oberbayern
- District: Erding
- Municipal assoc.: Wartenberg

Government
  - Mayor (2020–26): Josef Straßer (FW)

Area
  - Total: 27.49 km^{2} (10.61 sq mi)
- Elevation: 421 m (1,381 ft)

Population (2025-12-31)
  - Total: 2,884
  - Density: 104.9/km^{2} (271.7/sq mi)
- Time zone: UTC+01:00 (CET)
  - Summer (DST): UTC+02:00 (CEST)
- Postal codes: 85465
- Dialling codes: 08762
- Vehicle registration: ED
- Website: www.langenpreising.de

Langenpreising is a municipality in the district of Erding in Bavaria in Germany.
