= Kirchberg, Upper Bavaria =

Kirchberg
- Municipality
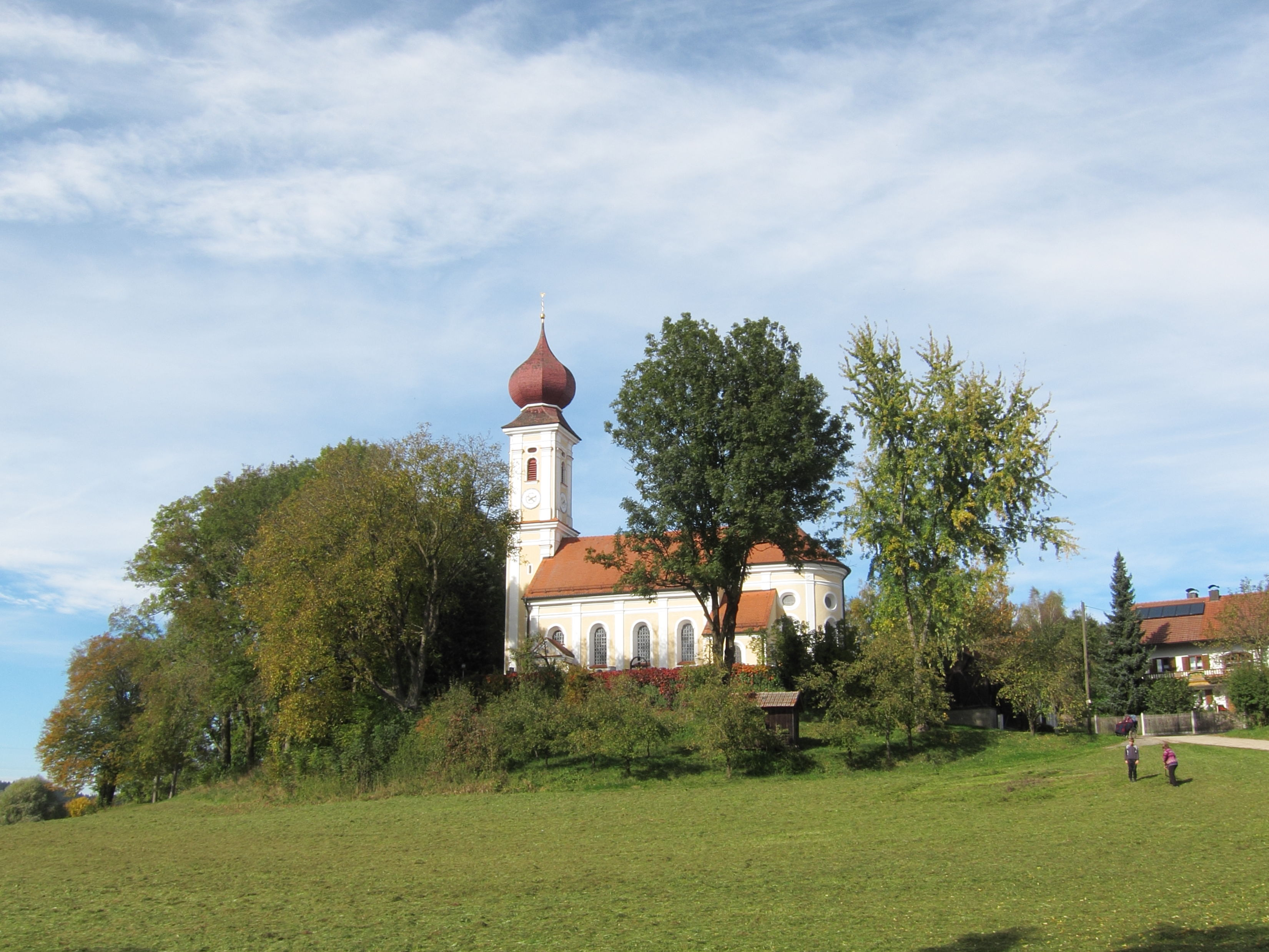
- Church of Saints Peter and Paul

- Coat of arms

- Location of Kirchberg within Erding district
- Interactive map of Kirchberg
- Location within Germany Location within Bavaria
- Coordinates: 48°24′N 12°3′E
- Country: Germany
- State: Bavaria
- Admin. region: Oberbayern
- District: Erding
- Municipal assoc.: Steinkirchen

Government
  - Mayor (2020–26): Dieter Neumaier

Area
  - Total: 17.1 km^{2} (6.6 sq mi)
- Elevation: 480–526 m (1,575–1,726 ft)

Population (2025-12-31)
  - Total: 1,163
  - Density: 68.0/km^{2} (176/sq mi)
- Time zone: UTC+01:00 (CET)
  - Summer (DST): UTC+02:00 (CEST)
- Postal codes: 84434
- Dialling codes: 08762 / 08706
- Vehicle registration: ED
- Website: http://www.gemeinde-kirchberg.de/

Kirchberg (German pronunciation: [ˈkɪʁçbɛʁk]) is a municipality in the district of Erding in Bavaria in Germany. Its climate type is temperate oceanic climate with the population about 4,280.
