= Wartenberg, Bavaria =

Wartenberg
- Municipality
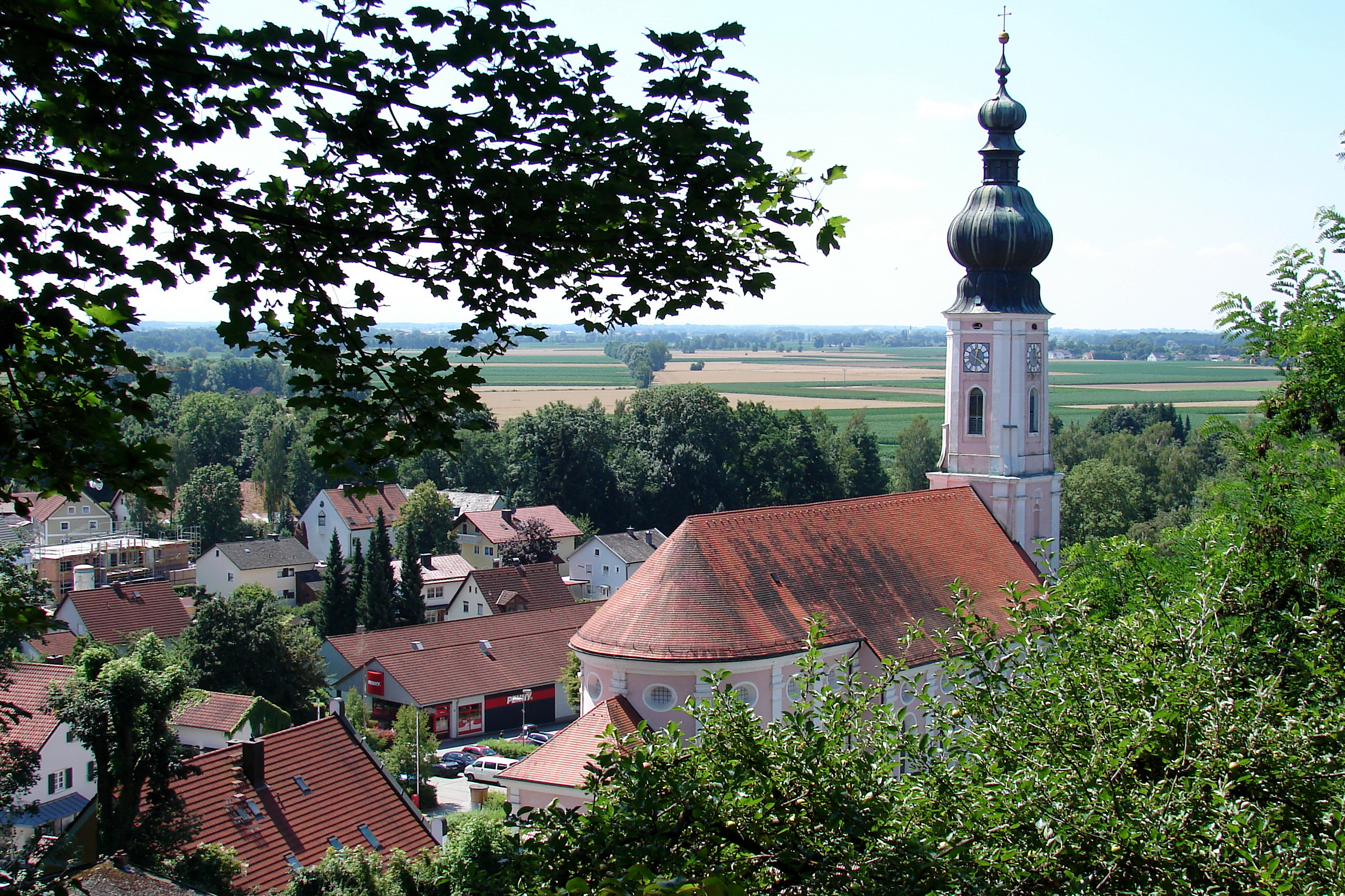
- Church of the Nativity of the Virgin Mary

- Coat of arms

- Location of Wartenberg within Erding district
- Interactive map of Wartenberg
- Location within Germany Location within Bavaria
- Coordinates: 48°24′18″N 11°59′20″E
- Country: Germany
- State: Bavaria
- Admin. region: Oberbayern
- District: Erding
- Municipal assoc.: Wartenberg
- Subdivisions: 8 Ortsteile

Government
  - Mayor (2020–26): Christian Pröbst (CSU)

Area
  - Total: 17.88 km^{2} (6.90 sq mi)
- Elevation: 430 m (1,410 ft)

Population (2025-12-31)
  - Total: 5,497
  - Density: 307.4/km^{2} (796.3/sq mi)
- Time zone: UTC+01:00 (CET)
  - Summer (DST): UTC+02:00 (CEST)
- Postal codes: 85456
- Dialling codes: 08762
- Vehicle registration: ED
- Website: www.vg-wartenberg.de

Wartenberg (German pronunciation: [ˈvaʁtn̩bɛʁk]) is a municipality in the district of Erding in Bavaria in Germany.
