= Pastetten (Verwaltungsgemeinschaft) =

- Verwaltungsgemeinschaft
- Location of Pastetten within Erding district
- Interactive map of Pastetten
- Location within Germany Location within Bavaria
- Coordinates: 48°12′N 11°57′E
- Country: Germany
- State: Bavaria
- Admin. region: Upper Bavaria
- District: Erding
- Seat: Pastetten
- Subdivisions: 2 municipalities

Area
  - Total: 44.82 km^{2} (17.31 sq mi)

Population (2025-12-31)
  - Total: 4,463
  - Density: 99.58/km^{2} (257.9/sq mi)
- Time zone: UTC+01:00 (CET)
  - Summer (DST): UTC+02:00 (CEST)
- Website: www.vg-pastetten.de

Pastetten is a Verwaltungsgemeinschaft (municipal association) in the district of Erding in Bavaria, Germany. Its seat is in Pastetten.

It consists of the following municipalities:

1. Buch am Buchrain
2. Pastetten
