= Steinkirchen =

- Municipality
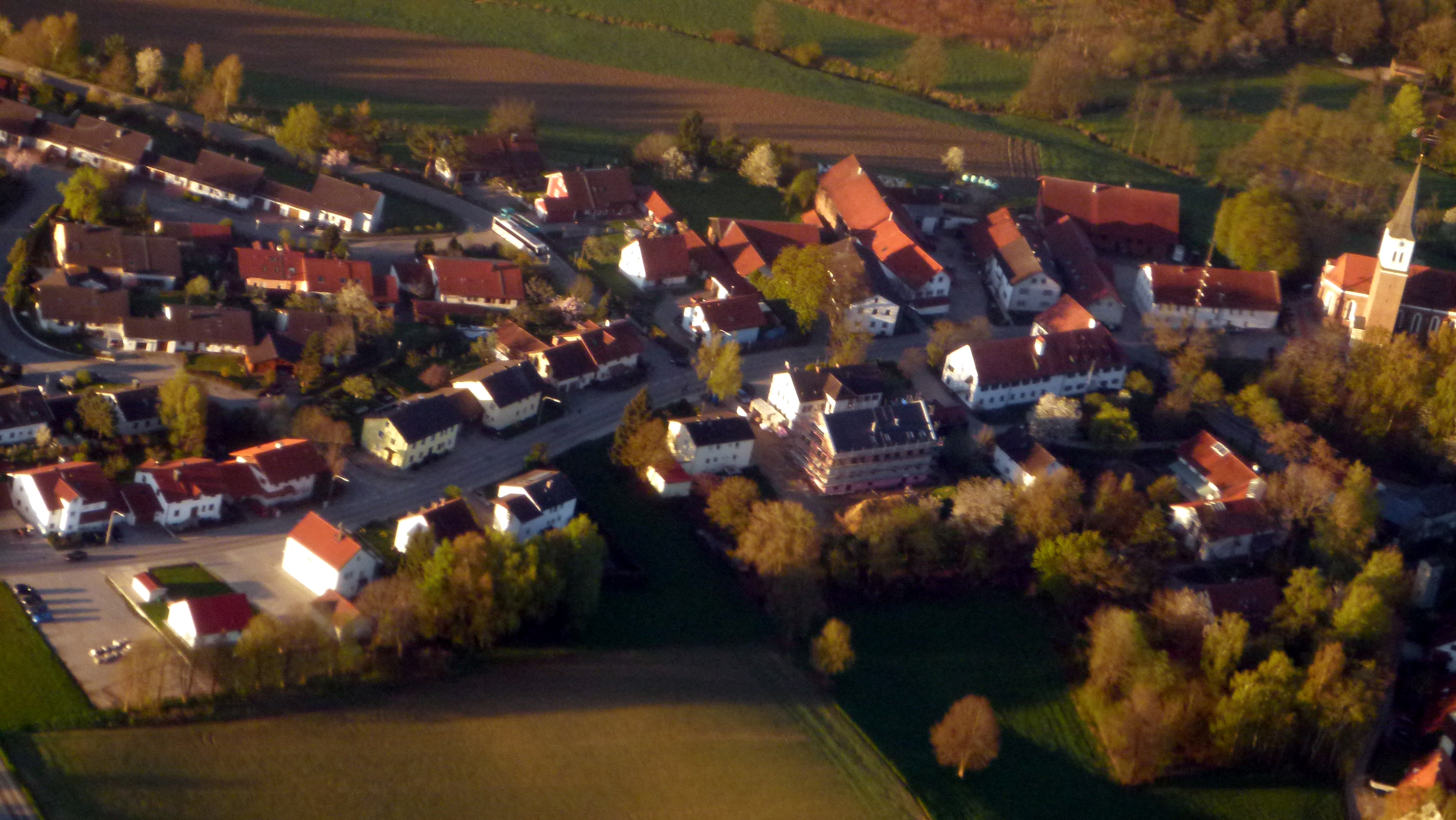
- Aerial view

- Coat of arms

- Location of Steinkirchen within Erding district
- Interactive map of Steinkirchen
- Location within Germany Location within Bavaria
- Coordinates: 48°23′N 12°5′E
- Country: Germany
- State: Bavaria
- Admin. region: Oberbayern
- District: Erding
- Municipal assoc.: Steinkirchen

Government
  - Mayor (2020–26): Johann Schweiger

Area
  - Total: 18.08 km^{2} (6.98 sq mi)
- Elevation: 493 m (1,617 ft)

Population (2025-12-31)
  - Total: 1,364
  - Density: 75.44/km^{2} (195.4/sq mi)
- Time zone: UTC+01:00 (CET)
  - Summer (DST): UTC+02:00 (CEST)
- Postal codes: 84439
- Dialling codes: 08084
- Vehicle registration: ED
- Website: http://www.gemeinde-steinkirchen.de/

Steinkirchen (German pronunciation: [ˈʃtaɪnkɪʁçn̩]) is a municipality in the district of Erding in Bavaria in Germany.
