= Hermann Wandinger =

German sculptor

- Born: 24 July 1897; Dorfen, Germany
- Died: 26 May 1976 (aged 78); Dorfen, Germany
- Occupation: Sculptor

Hermann Wandinger (24 July 1897 – 26 May 1976) was a German sculptor. His work was part of the sculpture event in the art competition at the 1936 Summer Olympics.
