= Inning am Holz =

Inning a.Holz
- Municipality
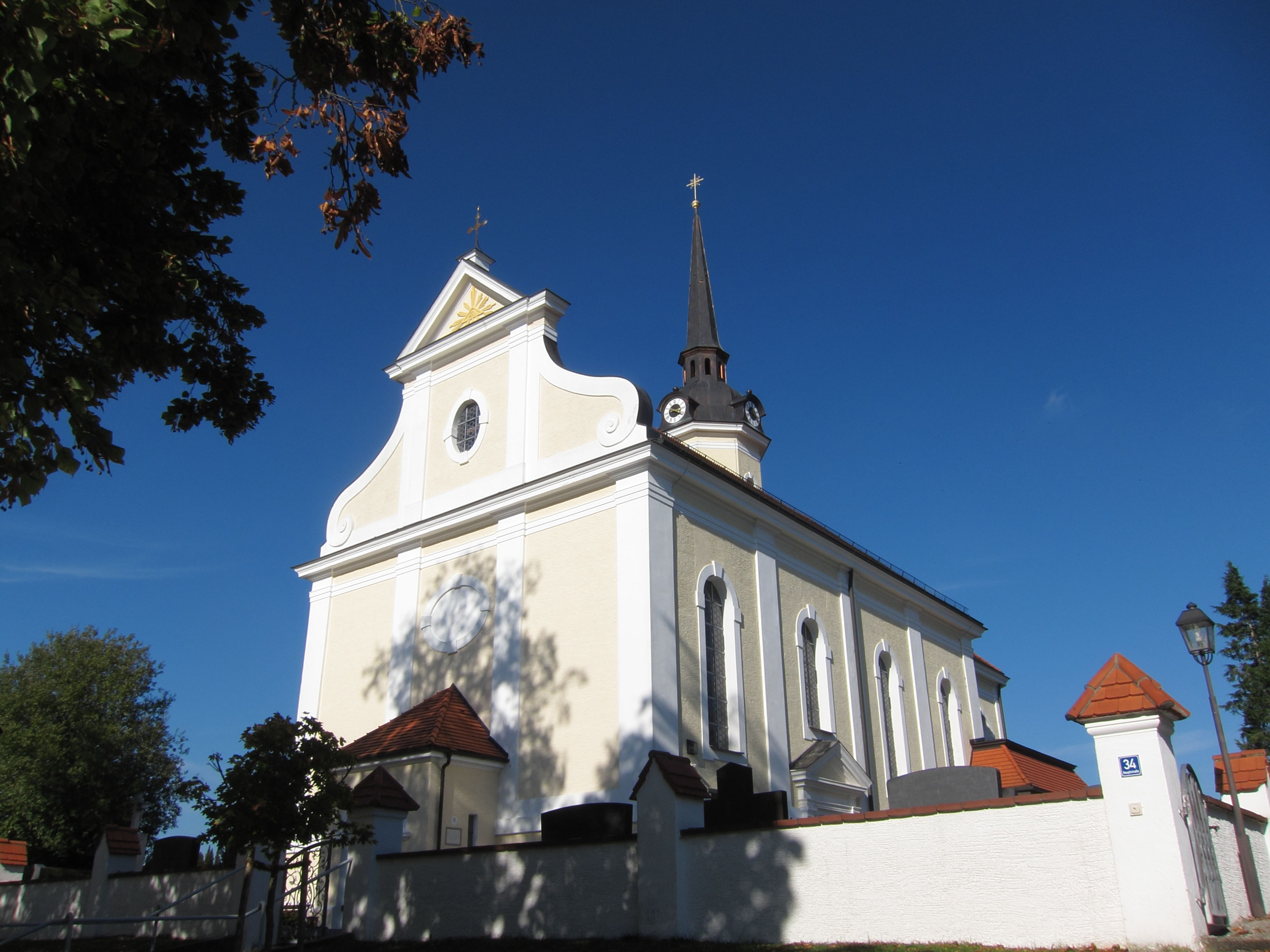
- Church of Saint Stephen

- Coat of arms

- Location of Inning a.Holz within Erding district
- Interactive map of Inning a.Holz
- Location within Germany Location within Bavaria
- Coordinates: 48°20′50″N 12°04′35″E
- Country: Germany
- State: Bavaria
- Admin. region: Oberbayern
- District: Erding
- Municipal assoc.: Steinkirchen

Government
  - Mayor (2020–26): Michaela Mühlen

Area
  - Total: 11.84 km^{2} (4.57 sq mi)
- Elevation: 505 m (1,657 ft)

Population (2025-12-31)
  - Total: 1,560
  - Density: 132/km^{2} (341/sq mi)
- Time zone: UTC+01:00 (CET)
  - Summer (DST): UTC+02:00 (CEST)
- Postal codes: 84416
- Dialling codes: 08084
- Vehicle registration: ED
- Website: http://www.gemeinde-inning.de/

Inning am Holz (German pronunciation: [ˈɪnɪŋ ʔam ˈhɔlts], lit. 'Inning at the Forest') is a municipality in the district of Erding in Bavaria in Germany.
