= Neuching =

- Municipality
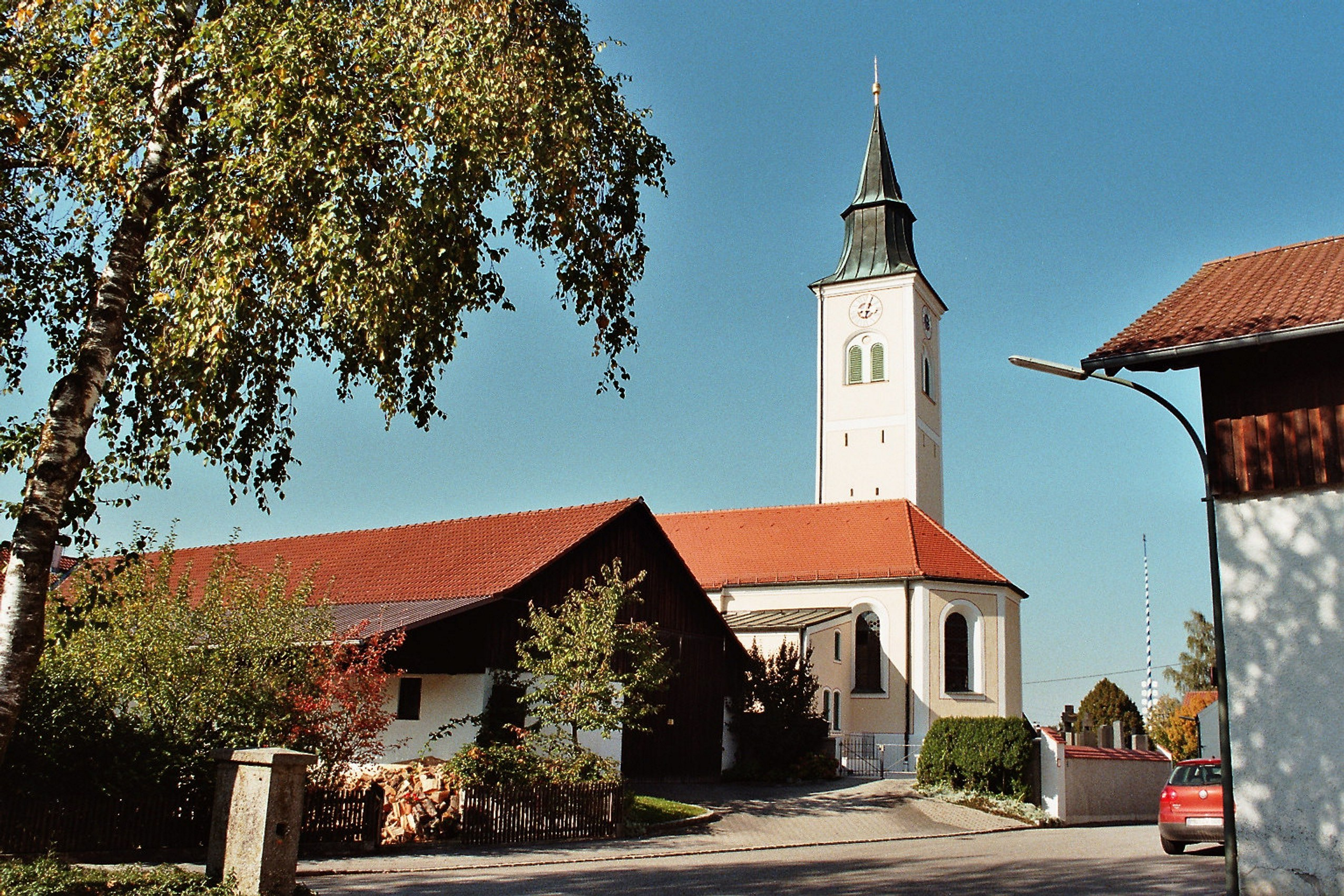
- Church of Saint Martin in Oberneuching

- Coat of arms

- Location of Neuching within Erding district
- Interactive map of Neuching
- Location within Germany Location within Bavaria
- Coordinates: 48°14′N 11°51′E
- Country: Germany
- State: Bavaria
- Admin. region: Oberbayern
- District: Erding
- Municipal assoc.: Oberneuching

Government
  - Mayor (2020–26): Thomas Bartl (CSU)

Area
  - Total: 19.68 km^{2} (7.60 sq mi)
- Elevation: 495 m (1,624 ft)

Population (2025-12-31)
  - Total: 2,789
  - Density: 141.7/km^{2} (367.0/sq mi)
- Time zone: UTC+01:00 (CET)
  - Summer (DST): UTC+02:00 (CEST)
- Postal codes: 85467
- Dialling codes: 08123
- Vehicle registration: ED
- Website: www.vg-oberneuching.de

Neuching (German pronunciation: [ˈnɔʏçɪŋ]) is a municipality in the district of Erding in Bavaria in Germany.
