= Buch am Buchrain =

Buch a.Buchrain
- Municipality
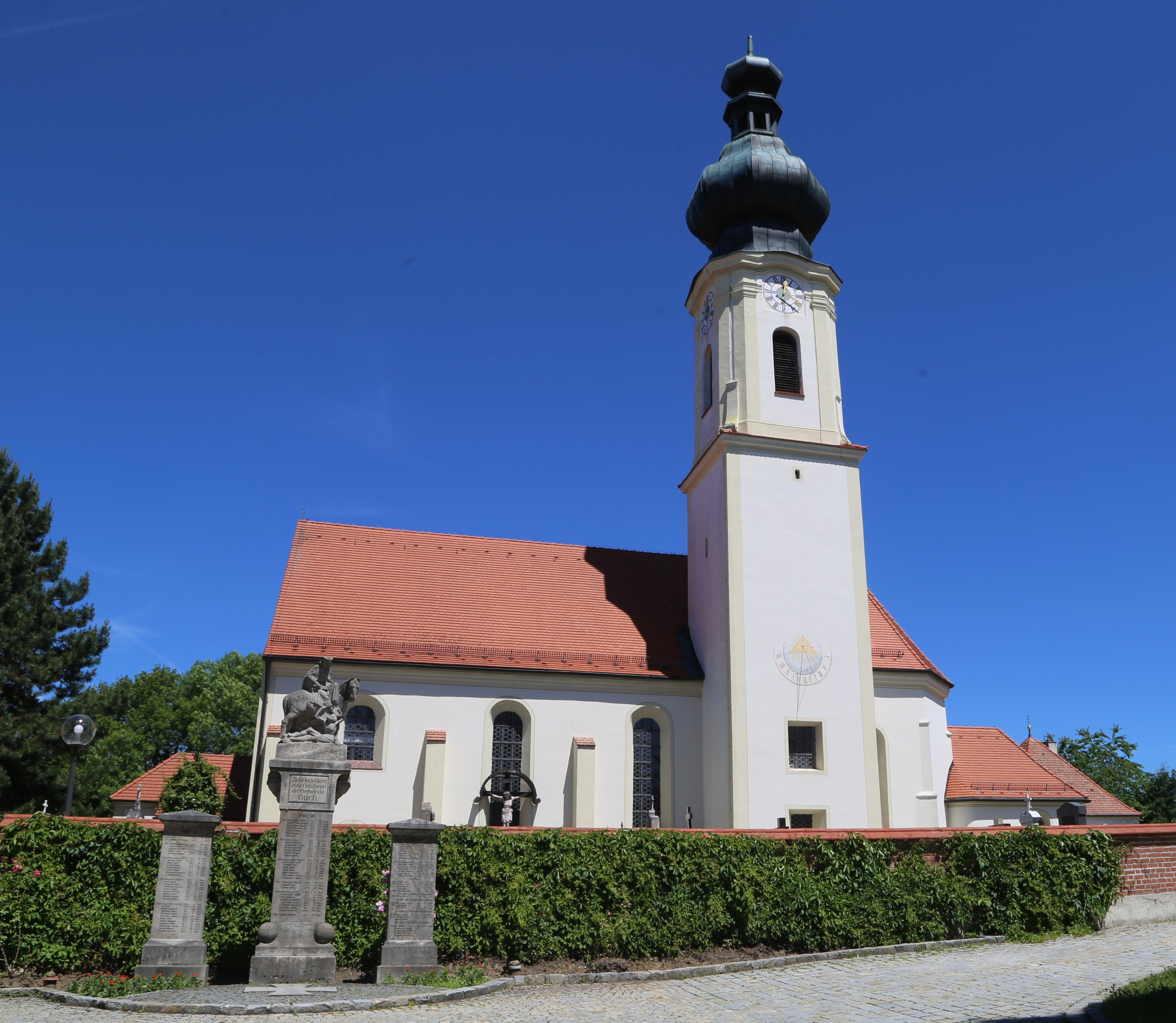
- Church of Saint Martin

- Coat of arms

- Location of Buch a.Buchrain within Erding district
- Interactive map of Buch a.Buchrain
- Location within Germany Location within Bavaria
- Coordinates: 48°13′N 12°00′E
- Country: Germany
- State: Bavaria
- Admin. region: Oberbayern
- District: Erding
- Municipal assoc.: Pastetten

Government
  - Mayor (2020–26): Ferdinand Geisberger (CSU)

Area
  - Total: 22.74 km^{2} (8.78 sq mi)
- Elevation: 533 m (1,749 ft)

Population (2025-12-31)
  - Total: 1,637
  - Density: 71.99/km^{2} (186.4/sq mi)
- Time zone: UTC+01:00 (CET)
  - Summer (DST): UTC+02:00 (CEST)
- Postal codes: 85656
- Dialling codes: 08124
- Vehicle registration: ED
- Website: www.buchambuchrain.de

Buch am Buchrain (German pronunciation: [ˈbuːx ʔam ˈbuːxʁaɪn]) is a municipality in the district of Erding in Bavaria in Germany.
