= Sempt =

River in Germany

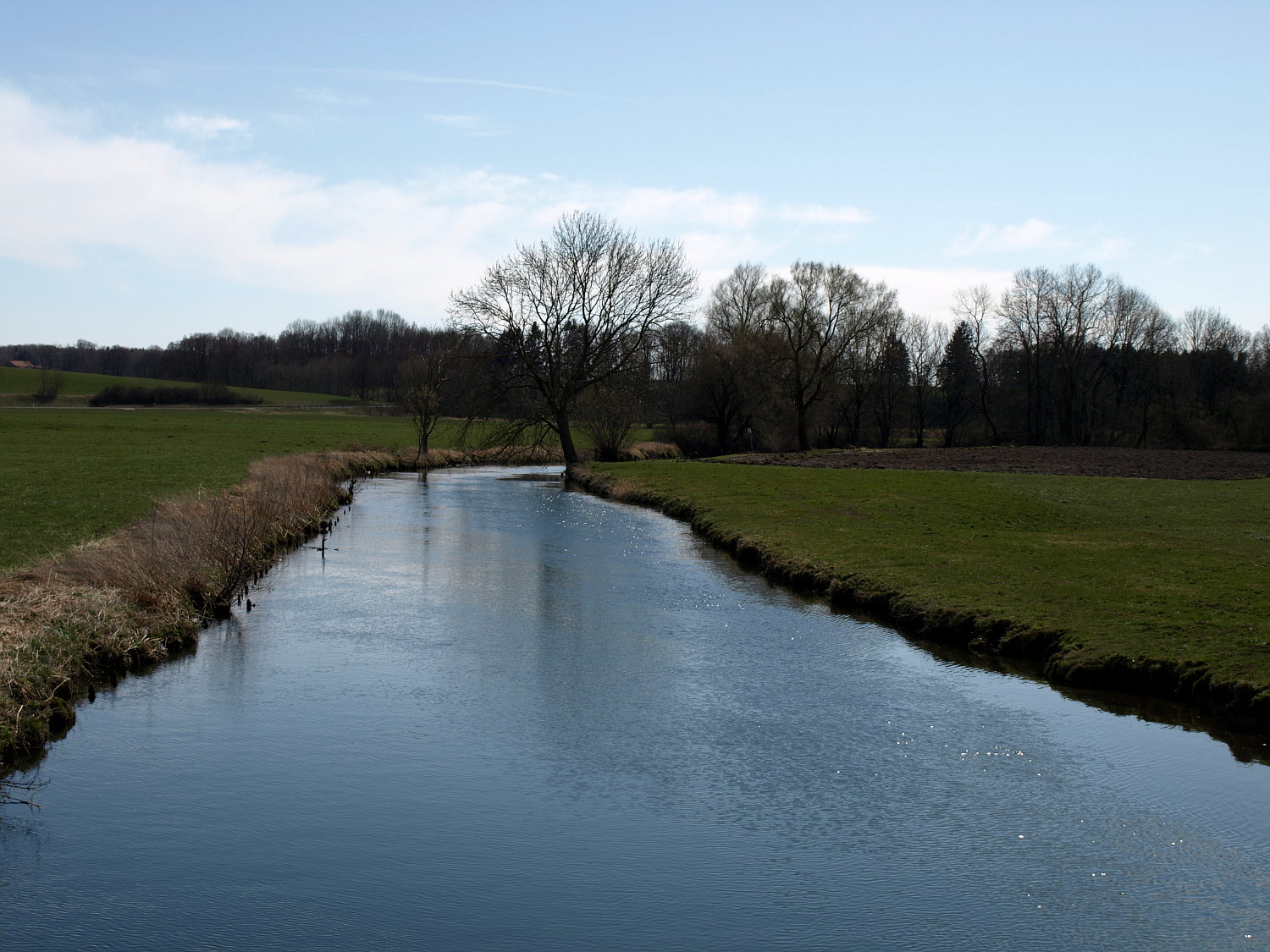
- The Sempt at Aufhausen, a borough of Erding

Location
- Country: Germany
- State: Bavaria

Physical characteristics
- Mouth
  - location: Mittlere-Isar-Kanal
  - coordinates: 48.4945°N 12.0036°E
- Length: 55.1 km (34.2 mi)
- Basin size: 444 km^{2} (171 sq mi)

Basin features
- Progression: Isar→ Danube→ Black Sea

Sempt is a river of Bavaria, Germany. It flows into the Mittlere-Isar-Kanal, which is connected with the Isar, west of Eching.

== See also ==
- List of rivers of Bavaria
