= Annales Sancti Quintini Viromandensis =

The Annales Sancti Quintini Viromandensis (Annals of Saint Quentin of Vermandois) are a set of annals originally composed in Latin at the Abbey of Saint-Quentin in the County of Vermandois, and found in manuscript 645 of the Vatican Library. It covers the years 793–994 and was written by five different hands.

Vatican 645 contains a copy of Bede's Easter table based on the Metonic cycle down to the year 1025. In the margins one hand has added the names of the Roman emperors down to Charlemagne (800–14). Another hand of the ninth century added two brief notices for the years 793 and 844. In the eleventh century, four more monks added notices in the margins of the Easter table. Most of these annals were not, therefore, contemporary. Several of the annals are cut off partially or entirely by poor subsequent bookbinding.

== Editions ==
- Ludwig Bethmann, ed. "Annales S. Quintini Viromandensis", MGH Scriptores, 16 (Hanover: 1859), pp. 507–08.
- Ferdinand LeProux, ed. and trans. "Annales S. Quintini Viromandensis", Mémoires de la Société académique de Saint-Quentin, III, 9 (1869), pp. 315–28.
