= Lengdorf =

- Municipality
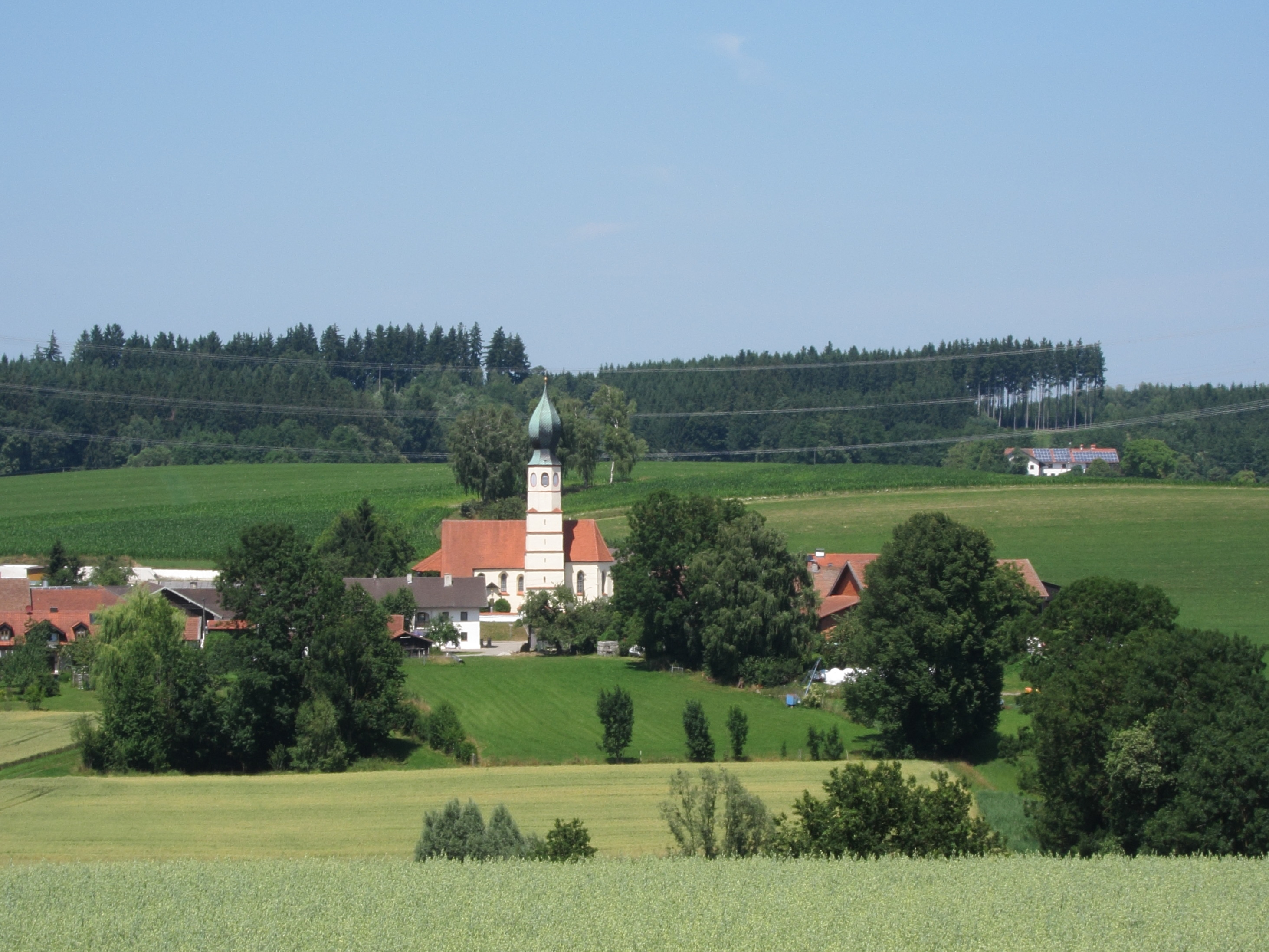
- Church of Saint Stephen in Niedergeislbach

- Coat of arms

- Location of Lengdorf within Erding district
- Interactive map of Lengdorf
- Location within Germany Location within Bavaria
- Coordinates: 48°16′N 12°3′E
- Country: Germany
- State: Bavaria
- Admin. region: Oberbayern
- District: Erding

Government
  - Mayor (2020–26): Michèle Forstmaier (FW)

Area
  - Total: 33.94 km^{2} (13.10 sq mi)
- Elevation: 473 m (1,552 ft)

Population (2025-12-31)
  - Total: 2,765
  - Density: 81.47/km^{2} (211.0/sq mi)
- Time zone: UTC+01:00 (CET)
  - Summer (DST): UTC+02:00 (CEST)
- Postal codes: 84435
- Dialling codes: 08083
- Vehicle registration: ED
- Website: www.lengdorf.de

Lengdorf (German pronunciation: [ˈlɛŋdɔʁf]) is a municipality in the district of Erding in Bavaria in Germany.
