= Hohenpolding =

- Municipality
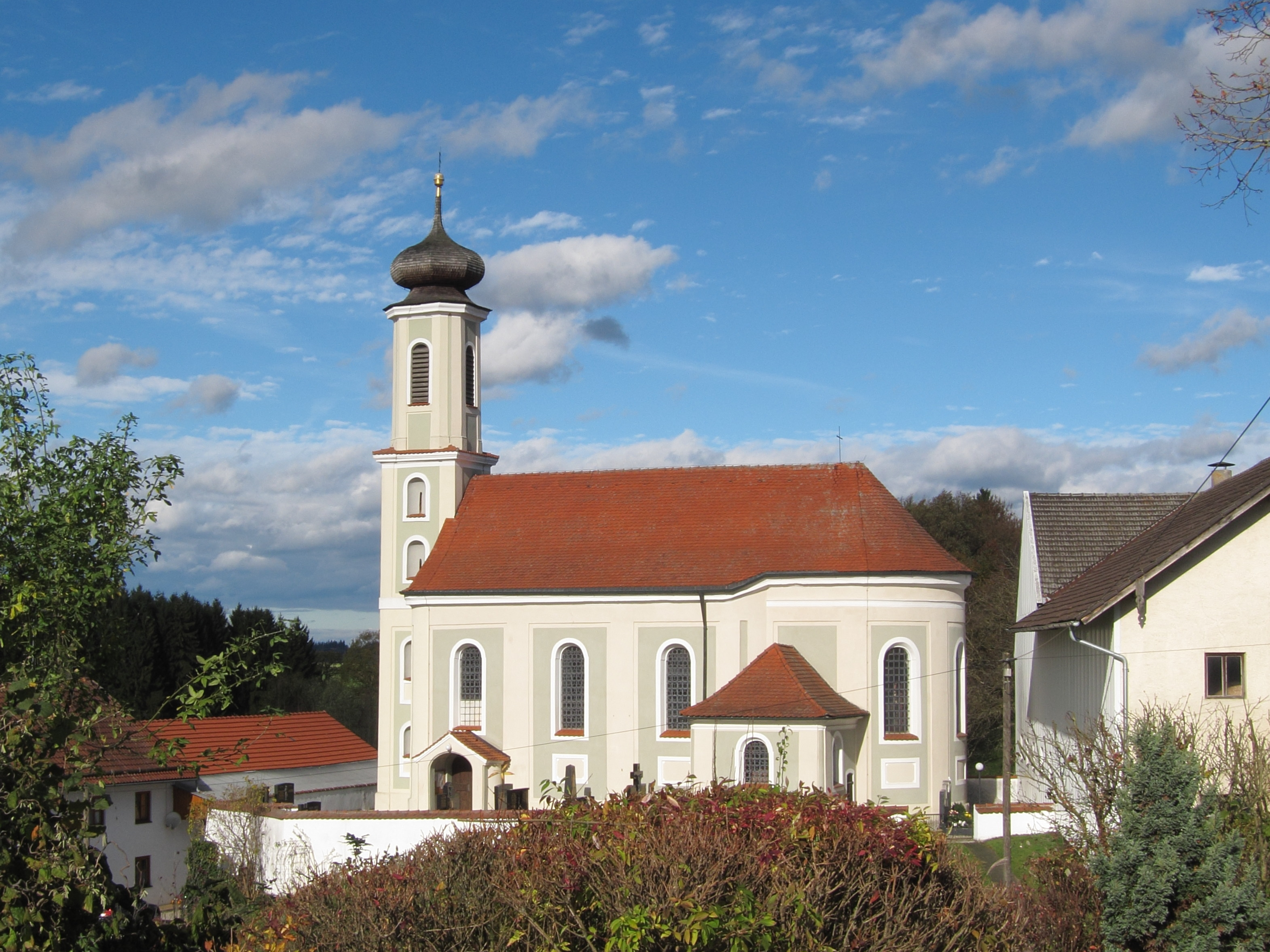
- Church of Saint Lambertus

- Coat of arms

- Location of Hohenpolding within Erding district
- Interactive map of Hohenpolding
- Location within Germany Location within Bavaria
- Coordinates: 48°23′4″N 12°7′55″E
- Country: Germany
- State: Bavaria
- Admin. region: Oberbayern
- District: Erding
- Municipal assoc.: Steinkirchen

Government
  - Mayor (2020–26): Alfons Beilhack

Area
  - Total: 27.42 km^{2} (10.59 sq mi)
- Elevation: 488 m (1,601 ft)

Population (2025-12-31)
  - Total: 1,648
  - Density: 60.10/km^{2} (155.7/sq mi)
- Time zone: UTC+01:00 (CET)
  - Summer (DST): UTC+02:00 (CEST)
- Postal codes: 84432
- Dialling codes: 08084
- Vehicle registration: ED
- Website: www.hohenpolding.de

Hohenpolding is a municipality in the district of Erding in Bavaria in Germany.
