= Walpertskirchen =

- Municipality
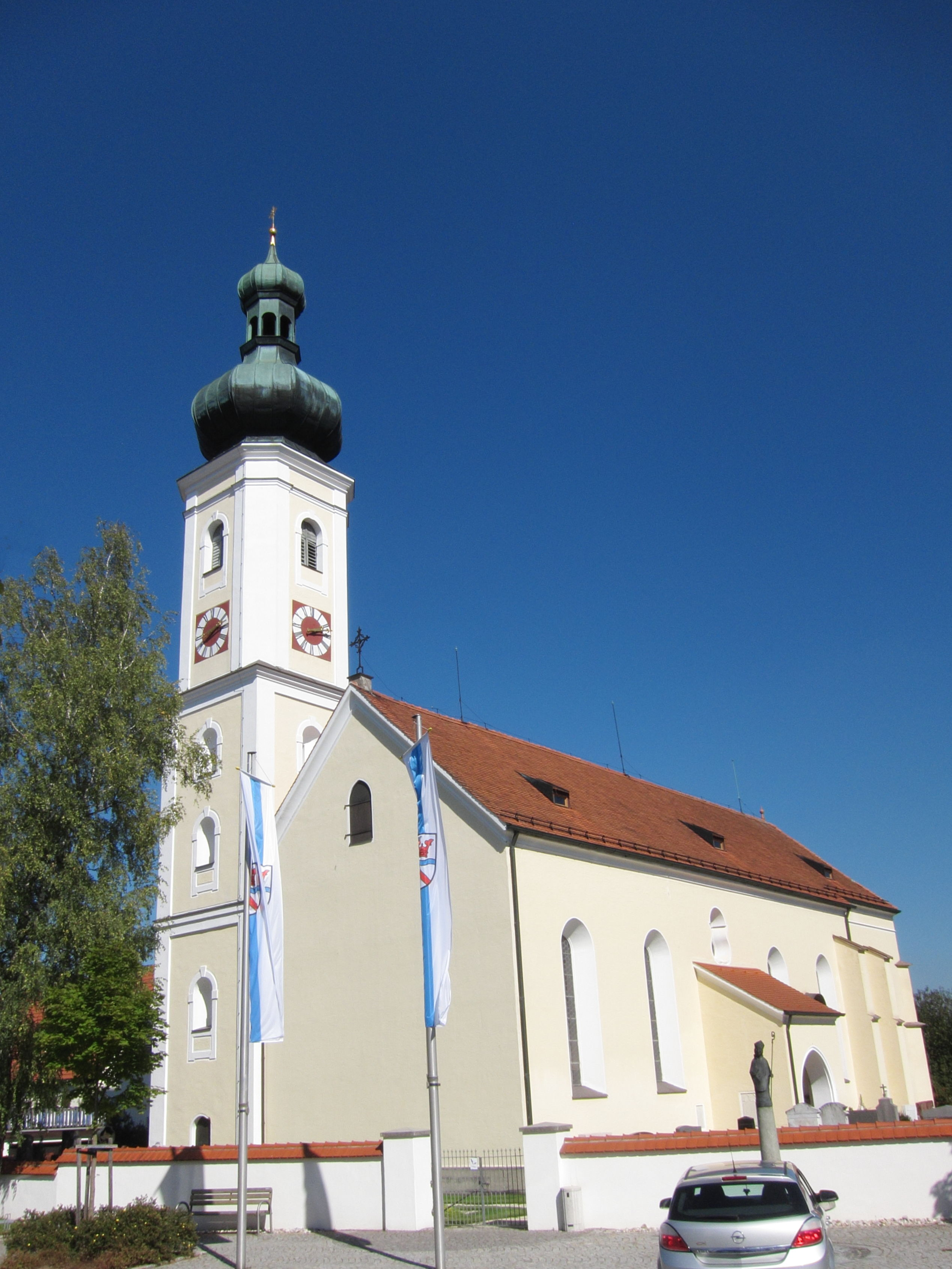
- Church of Saint Erhard

- Coat of arms

- Location of Walpertskirchen within Erding district
- Interactive map of Walpertskirchen
- Location within Germany Location within Bavaria
- Coordinates: 48°15′N 11°58′E
- Country: Germany
- State: Bavaria
- Admin. region: Oberbayern
- District: Erding
- Municipal assoc.: Hörlkofen

Government
  - Mayor (2020–26): Franz Hörmann (CSU)

Area
  - Total: 18.45 km^{2} (7.12 sq mi)
- Elevation: 468–539 m (1,535–1,768 ft)

Population (2025-12-31)
  - Total: 2,175
  - Density: 117.9/km^{2} (305.3/sq mi)
- Time zone: UTC+01:00 (CET)
  - Summer (DST): UTC+02:00 (CEST)
- Postal codes: 85469
- Dialling codes: 08122
- Vehicle registration: ED
- Website: www.walpertskirchen.de

Walpertskirchen is a municipality in the district of Erding in Bavaria in Germany.
