= Erding (district) =

Coordinates: 48°20′N 11°55′E

- District
- Flag Coat of arms
- Country: Germany
- State: Bavaria
- Adm. region: Upper Bavaria
- Capital: Erding

Government
  - District admin.: Martin Bayerstorfer (CSU)

Area
  - Total: 870.44 km^{2} (336.08 sq mi)

Population (31 December 2025)
  - Total: 140,456
  - Density: 161.36/km^{2} (417.93/sq mi)
- Time zone: UTC+01:00 (CET)
  - Summer (DST): UTC+02:00 (CEST)
- Vehicle registration: ED
- Website: landkreis-erding.de

Erding (German: Erding, Bavarian: Arrdeng) is a Landkreis (district) in Bavaria, Germany. It is bounded by (from the north and clockwise) the districts of Landshut, Mühldorf, Ebersberg, Munich and Freising.

== History ==
The region is one of the oldest parts of Bavaria. Erding was located on the way between two important centres of power in the Wittelsbach state, Munich and Landshut. About 1230, a castle was built on the river Sempt in order to secure the road. This castle grew to become the town of Erding.

The district of Erding was founded in 1946. Slight modifications took place in the administrative reform of 1971, when some villages from neighbouring districts were awarded to Erding.

== Geography ==
The district covers agriculturally used areas northeast of Munich. Several affluents of the Isar River cross the district from south to north, among them the Sempt. In the northwest there is the Erdinger Moos, which was once a large fen. A substantial part of this swampy area was drained in order to build the new airport of Munich, which opened in 1992.

== Coat of arms ==
The coat of arms displays:

- the white and blue lozengy pattern of Bavaria
- the horse from the arms of the county of Haag

== Towns and municipalities ==
Clickable map of towns and municipalities in the district

Towns
1. Dorfen
2. Erding

Markt

1. Isen
Municipalities
1. Bockhorn
2. Finsing
3. Forstern
4. Fraunberg

5. Lengdorf
6. Moosinning
7. Sankt Wolfgang
8. Taufkirchen (Vils)

Verwaltungsgemeinschaften
| 1. Hörlkofen; 1. Walpertskirchen; 2. Wörth^{1}; 2. Oberding; 1. Eitting; 2. Oberding^{1} | 3. Oberneuching; 1. Neuching^{1}; 2. Ottenhofen; 4. Pastetten; 1. Buch am Buchrain; 2. Pastetten^{1} | 5. Steinkirchen; 1. Hohenpolding; 2. Inning am Holz; 3. Kirchberg; 4. Steinkirchen^{1} | 6. Wartenberg; 1. Berglern; 2. Langenpreising; 3. Wartenberg^{1,2} |
^{1}seat of the Verwaltungsgemeinschaft; ^{2}Markt
