= Dorfen =

Town in Germany

- Town
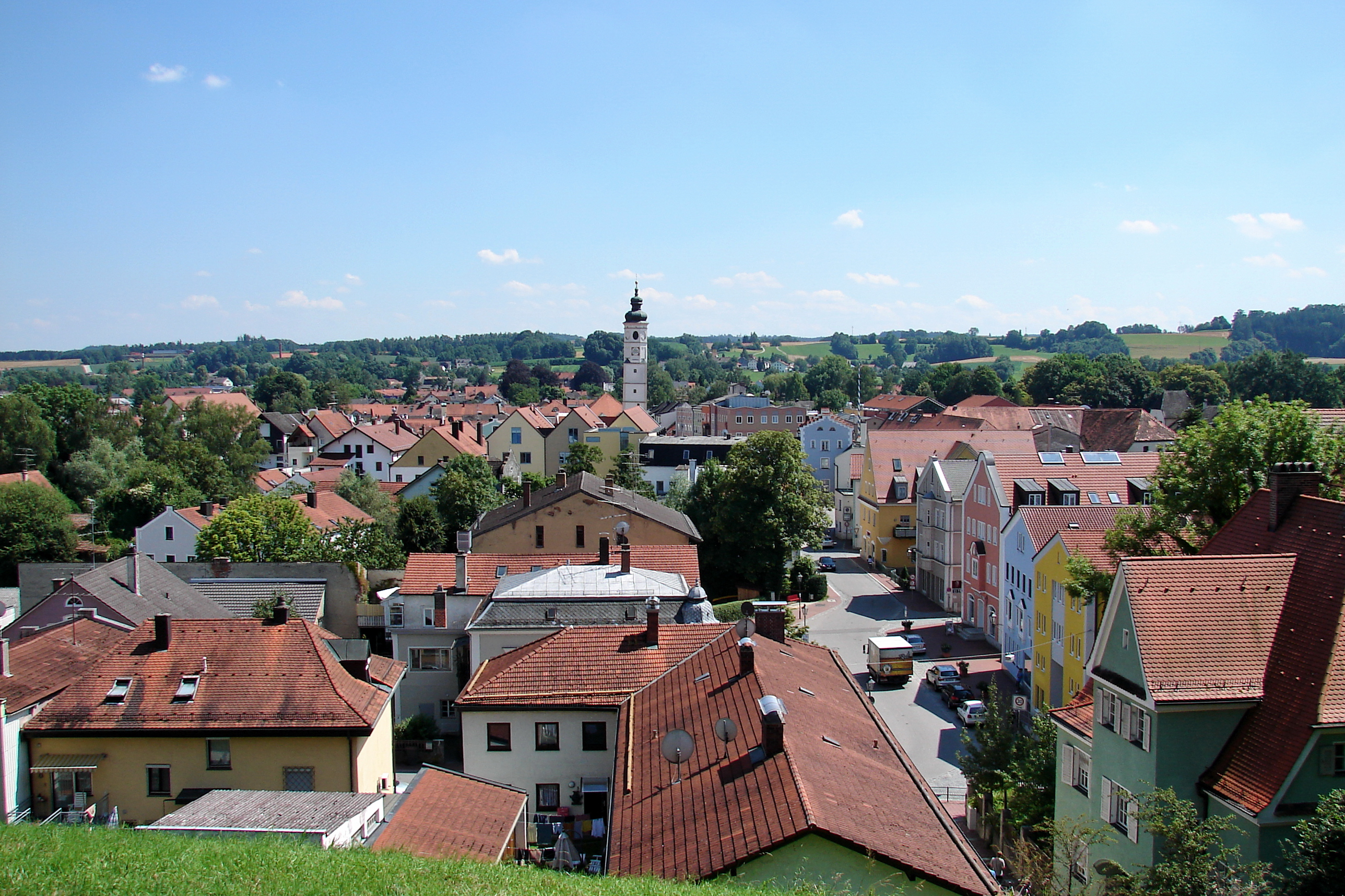
- Dorfen

- Coat of arms

- Location of Dorfen within Erding district
- Interactive map of Dorfen
- Location within Germany Location within Bavaria
- Coordinates: 48°16′N 12°9′E
- Country: Germany
- State: Bavaria
- Admin. region: Oberbayern
- District: Erding

Government
  - Mayor (2020–26): Heinz Grundner (CSU)

Area
  - Total: 99.56 km^{2} (38.44 sq mi)
- Elevation: 465 m (1,526 ft)

Population (2025-12-31)
  - Total: 14,727
  - Density: 147.9/km^{2} (383.1/sq mi)
- Time zone: UTC+01:00 (CET)
  - Summer (DST): UTC+02:00 (CEST)
- Postal codes: 84405
- Dialling codes: 08081
- Vehicle registration: ED
- Website: www.dorfen.de

Dorfen (German pronunciation: [ˈdɔʁfn̩]) is a town in the district of Erding, in Bavaria, Germany. It is situated 50 km east of Munich and 29 km south of Landshut.

== Transportation ==
Dorfen is situated at the Munich-Mühldorf railway.

== People ==
- Johann Georg von Dillis (1759–1841), painter
- Hermann Wandinger (1897–1976), sculptor
- Jochen Mass (1946–2025), racing driver
- Michael Mittermeier (born 1966), comedian
