= Ingolstadt (electoral district) =

Federal electoral district of Germany

215 Ingolstadt
- Electoral district for the Bundestag
- Ingolstadt in 2025
- State: Bavaria
- Population: 338,000 (2019)
- Electorate: 235,847 (2025)
- Major settlements: Ingolstadt; Neuburg an der Donau; Eichstätt
- Area: 1,845.6 km^{2}

Current electoral district
- Created: 1949
- Party: CSU
- Member: Reinhard Brandl
- Elected: 2009, 2013, 2017, 2021, 2025

Ingolstadt is an electoral constituency (German: Wahlkreis) represented in the Bundestag. It elects one member via first-past-the-post voting. Under the current constituency numbering system, it is designated as constituency 215. It is located in central Bavaria, comprising the city of Ingolstadt, the district of Eichstätt, and the northern part of the Neuburg-Schrobenhausen district.

Ingolstadt was created for the inaugural 1949 federal election. Since 2009, it has been represented by Reinhard Brandl of the Christian Social Union (CSU).

== Geography ==
Ingolstadt is located in central Bavaria. As of the 2021 federal election, it comprises the independent city of Ingolstadt, the district of Eichstätt, and the municipalities of Bergheim, Burgheim, Ehekirchen, Karlshuld, Karlskron, Königsmoos, Neuburg an der Donau, Oberhausen, Rennertshofen, Rohrenfels, and Weichering from the district of Neuburg-Schrobenhausen.

== History ==
Ingolstadt was created in 1949. In the 1949 election, it was Bavaria constituency 3 in the numbering system. In the 1953 through 1961 elections, it was number 198. In the 1965 through 1972 elections, it was number 202. In the 1976 election, it was number 203. In the 1980 through 1998 elections, it was number 202. In the 2002 and 2005 elections, it was number 218. In the 2009 and 2013 elections, it was number 217. In the 2017 and 2021 elections, it was number 216. From the 2025 election, it has been number 215.

Originally, the constituency comprised the independent city of Ingolstadt and the districts of Landkreis Ingolstadt, Aichach, Pfaffenhofen, and Schrobenhausen. In the 1976 through 2009 elections, it comprised the city of Ingolstadt and the districts of Eichstätt and Neuburg-Schrobenhausen. In the 2013 election, it lost the municipality of Aresing from the Neuburg-Schrobenhausen district. It acquired its current borders in the 2017 election.

Election	No.	Name	Borders
1949	3	Ingolstadt	Ingolstadt city; Landkreis Ingolstadt district; Aichach district; Pfaffenhofen district; Schrobenhausen district
1953	198	Ingolstadt	Ingolstadt city; Landkreis Ingolstadt district; Aichach district; Pfaffenhofen district; Schrobenhausen district
1957	198	Ingolstadt	Ingolstadt city; Landkreis Ingolstadt district; Aichach district; Pfaffenhofen district; Schrobenhausen district
1961	198	Ingolstadt	Ingolstadt city; Landkreis Ingolstadt district; Aichach district; Pfaffenhofen district; Schrobenhausen district
1965	202	Ingolstadt	Ingolstadt city; Landkreis Ingolstadt district; Aichach district; Pfaffenhofen district; Schrobenhausen district
1969	202	Ingolstadt	Ingolstadt city; Landkreis Ingolstadt district; Aichach district; Pfaffenhofen district; Schrobenhausen district
1972	202	Ingolstadt	Ingolstadt city; Landkreis Ingolstadt district; Aichach district; Pfaffenhofen district; Schrobenhausen district
1976	203	Ingolstadt	Ingolstadt city; Eichstätt district; Neuburg-Schrobenhausen district
1980	202	Ingolstadt	Ingolstadt city; Eichstätt district; Neuburg-Schrobenhausen district
1983	202	Ingolstadt	Ingolstadt city; Eichstätt district; Neuburg-Schrobenhausen district
1987	202	Ingolstadt	Ingolstadt city; Eichstätt district; Neuburg-Schrobenhausen district
1990	202	Ingolstadt	Ingolstadt city; Eichstätt district; Neuburg-Schrobenhausen district
1994	202	Ingolstadt	Ingolstadt city; Eichstätt district; Neuburg-Schrobenhausen district
1998	202	Ingolstadt	Ingolstadt city; Eichstätt district; Neuburg-Schrobenhausen district
2002	218	Ingolstadt	Ingolstadt city; Eichstätt district; Neuburg-Schrobenhausen district
2005	218	Ingolstadt	Ingolstadt city; Eichstätt district; Neuburg-Schrobenhausen district
2009	217	Ingolstadt	Ingolstadt city; Eichstätt district; Neuburg-Schrobenhausen district
2013	217	Ingolstadt	Ingolstadt city; Eichstätt district; Neuburg-Schrobenhausen district (excluding Aresing municipality)
2017	216	Ingolstadt	Ingolstadt city; Eichstätt district; Neuburg-Schrobenhausen district (only Bergheim, Burgheim, Ehekirchen, Karlshuld, Karlskron, Königsmoos, Neuburg an der Donau, Oberhausen, Rennertshofen, Rohrenfels, and Weichering municipalities)
2021	216	Ingolstadt	Ingolstadt city; Eichstätt district; Neuburg-Schrobenhausen district (only Bergheim, Burgheim, Ehekirchen, Karlshuld, Karlskron, Königsmoos, Neuburg an der Donau, Oberhausen, Rennertshofen, Rohrenfels, and Weichering municipalities)
2025	215	Ingolstadt	Ingolstadt city; Eichstätt district; Neuburg-Schrobenhausen district (only Bergheim, Burgheim, Ehekirchen, Karlshuld, Karlskron, Königsmoos, Neuburg an der Donau, Oberhausen, Rennertshofen, Rohrenfels, and Weichering municipalities)

== Members ==
The constituency has been held by the Christian Social Union (CSU) during all but one Bundestag term since its creation. It was first represented by Hermann Aumer from 1949 to 1953. He was elected for the Bavaria Party (BP), expelled in 1950, and served the remainder of the term as an independent. Hans Demmelmeier won it for the CSU in 1953 and served until 1961. Paul Weinzierl then served one term. Karl Heinz Gierenstein was representative from 1965 to 1980. Horst Seehofer was elected in 1980 and served until 2008, a total of eight consecutive terms. He resigned in 2008 to become Minister-President of Bavaria. Reinhard Brandl was elected in 2009, and re-elected in 2013, 2017, 2021, and 2025.

Election	Member	Party	%
1949	Hermann Aumer (Note: Aumer was elected for the Bavaria Party, but expelled in September 1950.)	BP	29.8
1949	Hermann Aumer	Ind.	29.8
1953	Hans Demmelmeier	CSU	49.0
1957	Hans Demmelmeier	CSU	63.6
1961	Paul Weinzierl	CSU	66.0
1965	Karl Heinz Gierenstein	CSU	64.2
1969	Karl Heinz Gierenstein	CSU	62.1
1972	Karl Heinz Gierenstein	CSU	62.5
1976	Karl Heinz Gierenstein	CSU	66.1
1980	Horst Seehofer	CSU	65.5
1983	Horst Seehofer	CSU	68.8
1987	Horst Seehofer	CSU	64.6
1990	Horst Seehofer	CSU	62.6
1994	Horst Seehofer	CSU	62.7
1998	Horst Seehofer	CSU	55.0
2002	Horst Seehofer	CSU	65.3
2005	Horst Seehofer	CSU	65.9
2009	Reinhard Brandl	CSU	57.2
2013	Reinhard Brandl	CSU	61.5
2017	Reinhard Brandl	CSU	49.5
2021	Reinhard Brandl	CSU	44.9
2025	Reinhard Brandl	CSU	47.1

== Election results ==
=== 2025 election ===
Federal election (2025): Ingolstagt
Notes:	Blue background denotes the winner of the electorate vote. Pink background denotes a candidate elected from their party list. Yellow background denotes an electorate win by a list member, or other incumbent. A ✓ or ✗ denotes status of any incumbent, win or lose respectively.						
Party	Candidate	Votes	%	±%	Party votes	%	±%
CSU	✓ Dr. Reinhard Brandl	91,837	47.1	▲2.2	78,647	40.3	▲5.6
AfD	Lukas Rehm	39,220	20.1	▲10.5	41,850	21.4	▲11.4
SPD	Nadine Praun	21,555	11.0	▼2.9	19,812	10.1	▼6.8
Greens	Merlin Georg Friedrich Nagel	14,531	7.4	▼2.3	18,024	9.2	▼1.9
FW	Martina Inge Edl	9,906	5.1	▼3.3	9,142	4.7	▼3.7
Left	Sarah Vollath	7,730	4.0	▲1.5	9,258	4.7	▲2.4
FDP	Nikita Jan Renner	3,711	1.9	▼3.9	7,350	3.8	▼6.8
BSW					5,869	3.0	
APT	Dr. Christophe Andreoli	2,001	1.0		1,411	0.2	▼0.2
ÖDP	Franz Hofmaier	1,629	0.8	▼0.5	826	0.4	▼0.2
Volt	Benedikt Schatz	1,575	0.8		1,033	0.5	▲0.3
PARTEI	Jens Rohrer	1,385	0.7	▼0.5	863	0.4	▼0.3
dieBasis					652	0.3	▼1.2
BP					301	0.2	▼0.4
BD					150	0.1	
Humanists					113	0.1	Steady
MLPD					31	0.0	Steady
Informal votes		956			704		
Total valid votes		195,080			195,332		
Turnout		196,036	83.1	▲4.5			
CSU hold	Majority	52,617	27.0	▼4.0			

=== 2021 election ===
Federal election (2021): Ingolstadt
Notes:	Blue background denotes the winner of the electorate vote. Pink background denotes a candidate elected from their party list. Yellow background denotes an electorate win by a list member, or other incumbent. A ✓ or ✗ denotes status of any incumbent, win or lose respectively.						
Party	Candidate	Votes	%	±%	Party votes	%	±%
CSU	✓ Reinhard Brandl	83,663	44.9	▼4.6	64,577	34.6	▼7.1
SPD	Jessica Meier	25,954	13.9	▲0.3	31,592	16.9	▲3.6
Greens	Joachim Siebler	18,182	9.8	▲3.5	20,833	11.2	▲3.9
AfD	Lukas Rehm	17,806	9.6	▼3.4	18,694	10.0	▼5.1
FW	Christian Ponzer	15,515	8.3	▲4.4	15,580	8.4	▲5.3
FDP	Theresa Ley	10,877	5.8	▲0.7	19,797	10.6	▲1.2
Left	Roland Meier	4,648	2.5	▼2.3	4,450	2.4	▼3.0
dieBasis	Helmut Groß	2,969	1.6		2,890	1.5	
Tierschutzpartei					1,652	0.9	▲0.2
ÖDP	Jakob Sedlmeier	2,438	1.3	▼0.1	1,231	0.7	▼0.3
PARTEI	Sebastian Zahn	2,315	1.2	▲0.2	1,295	0.7	0.0
BP	Wolfgang Distler	1,861	1.0	▼0.2	1,111	0.6	▼0.4
Team Todenhöfer					643	0.3	
Pirates					533	0.3	▼0.1
Volt					362	0.2	
Unabhängige					294	0.2	
Gesundheitsforschung					216	0.1	0.0
V-Partei3					165	0.1	▼0.1
Humanists					142	0.1	
NPD					129	0.1	▼0.2
Bündnis C					97	0.1	
du.					86	0.0	
The III. Path					77	0.0	
MLPD					31	0.0	0.0
LKR					31	0.0	
DKP					30	0.0	0.0
Informal votes		1,167			856		
Total valid votes		186,229			186,539		
Turnout		187,395	78.6	▲1.5			
CSU hold	Majority	57,709	31.0	▼4.9			

=== 2017 election ===
Federal election (2017): Ingolstadt
Notes:	Blue background denotes the winner of the electorate vote. Pink background denotes a candidate elected from their party list. Yellow background denotes an electorate win by a list member, or other incumbent. A ✓ or ✗ denotes status of any incumbent, win or lose respectively.						
Party	Candidate	Votes	%	±%	Party votes	%	±%
CSU	✓ Reinhard Brandl	90,383	49.5	▼11.6	76,236	41.7	▼13.9
SPD	Werner Widuckel	24,799	13.6	▼3.1	24,424	13.4	▼4.1
AfD	Christina Wilhelm	23,720	13.0	▲10.2	27,673	15.1	▲11.6
Greens	Agnes Krumwiede	11,515	6.3	▼0.3	13,205	7.2	▲1.0
FDP	Jakob Schäuble	9,310	5.1	▲3.1	17,154	9.4	▲5.1
Left	Roland Meier	8,817	4.8	▲0.8	9,830	5.4	▲1.7
FW	Angela Mayr	7,093	3.9	▲0.9	5,562	3.0	▲0.1
ÖDP	Jakob Sedlmeier	2,656	1.5	▲0.1	1,755	1.0	▼0.2
BP	Wolfgang Distler	2,200	1.2		1,898	1.0	0.0
PARTEI	Bernd Sandner	1,859	1.0	▲0.7	1,294	0.7	
Tierschutzpartei					1,278	0.7	▲0.1
Pirates					631	0.3	▼1.4
NPD					520	0.3	▼0.6
V-Partei³					397	0.2	
DM					270	0.1	
Gesundheitsforschung					248	0.1	
DiB					202	0.1	
BGE					165	0.1	
MLPD	Arnold Aschenbrenner	120	0.1		61	0.0	0.0
BüSo					23	0.0	0.0
DKP					19	0.0	
Informal votes		1,587			1,214		
Total valid votes		182,472			182,845		
Turnout		184,059	77.1	▲8.7			
CSU hold	Majority	65,584	35.9	▼9.1			

=== 2013 election ===
Federal election (2013): Ingolstadt
Notes:	Blue background denotes the winner of the electorate vote. Pink background denotes a candidate elected from their party list. Yellow background denotes an electorate win by a list member, or other incumbent. A ✓ or ✗ denotes status of any incumbent, win or lose respectively.						
Party	Candidate	Votes	%	±%	Party votes	%	±%
CSU	✓ Reinhard Brandl	106,668	61.5	▲4.4	96,804	55.9	▲5.3
SPD	Stefan Schieren	28,561	16.5	▲1.0	29,880	17.3	▲1.8
Greens	Agnes Krumwiede	11,340	6.5	▼1.6	10,752	6.2	▼2.0
Left	Eva Bulling-Schröter	6,755	3.9	▼2.4	6,163	3.6	▼2.6
FW	Christoph Kalkowski	5,205	3.0		5,114	3.0	
AfD	Christiane Boruzs	4,878	2.8		6,089	3.5	
Pirates	Andreas Popp	3,615	2.1		3,095	1.8	▼0.2
FDP	Anton Brandl	3,471	2.0	▼6.1	7,407	4.3	▼8.1
ÖDP	Christian Tischler	2,224	1.3	▼1.0	1,986	1.1	▼0.2
BP					1,796	1.0	▲0.3
NPD					1,472	0.8	▼0.6
Tierschutzpartei					1,061	0.6	0.0
REP					727	0.4	▼0.3
PARTEI		615	0.4				
DIE FRAUEN					266	0.2	
DIE VIOLETTEN					194	0.1	0.0
Party of Reason					176	0.1	
PRO					104	0.1	
RRP					63	0.0	▼0.3
MLPD					27	0.0	0.0
BüSo					23	0.0	▼0.1
Informal votes		1,378			1,511		
Total valid votes		173,332			173,199		
Turnout		174,710	68.6	▼1.2			
CSU hold	Majority	78,107	45.0	▲3.2			

=== 2009 election ===
Federal election (2009): Ingolstadt
Notes:	Blue background denotes the winner of the electorate vote. Pink background denotes a candidate elected from their party list. Yellow background denotes an electorate win by a list member, or other incumbent. A ✓ or ✗ denotes status of any incumbent, win or lose respectively.						
Party	Candidate	Votes	%	±%	Party votes	%	±%
CSU	Reinhard Brandl	99,482	57.2	▼8.7	86,686	49.6	▼3.0
SPD	Ursula Engelen-Kefer	26,825	15.4	▼6.6	26,877	15.4	▼10.9
Greens	Agnes Krumwiede	14,174	8.2	▲4.0	14,283	8.2	▲2.4
FDP	Franz Schmidt	14,151	8.1	▲5.6	21,566	12.3	▲4.7
Left	Eva Bulling-Schröter	10,936	6.3	▲3.5	10,717	6.1	▲3.0
Pirates					3,448	2.0	
ÖDP	Elisabeth Winkler	3,874	2.2		2,327	1.3	
NPD	Stefan Faber	3,308	1.9	▲0.4	2,588	1.5	▲0.2
BP					1,351	0.8	▲0.2
REP					1,269	0.7	▼0.3
FAMILIE					1,157	0.7	▼0.2
Tierschutzpartei					999	0.6	
RRP					592	0.3	
Independent	Manfred Franzke	466	0.3				
DIE VIOLETTEN					228	0.1	
PBC					227	0.1	▼0.1
CM					146	0.1	
BüSo	Alois Schieber	661	0.4		120	0.1	0.0
DVU					86	0.0	
MLPD					34	0.0	0.0
Informal votes		2,441			1,617		
Total valid votes		173,877			174,701		
Turnout		176,318	69.8	▼6.4			
CSU hold	Majority	72,657	41.8	▼2.1			

=== 2005 election ===
Federal election (2005):Ingolstadt
Notes:	Blue background denotes the winner of the electorate vote. Pink background denotes a candidate elected from their party list. Yellow background denotes an electorate win by a list member, or other incumbent. A ✓ or ✗ denotes status of any incumbent, win or lose respectively.						
Party	Candidate	Votes	%	±%	Party votes	%	±%
CSU	✓ Horst Seehofer	121,771	65.9	▲0.6	97,356	52.7	▼10.3
SPD	Michael Kettner	40,630	22.0	▼1.8	48,613	26.3	▲0.8
Greens	Petra Kleine	7,741	4.2	▼2.1	10,631	5.7	▲0.2
Left	Eva Bulling-Schröter	5,075	2.7	▲1.7	5,834	3.2	▲2.6
FDP	Alexander Kalouti	4,709	2.5	0.0	14,183	7.7	▲4.1
NPD	Richard Vahlberg	2,735	1.5		2,334	1.3	▲1.1
Familie	Simone Vosswinkel	2,132	1.2		1,634	0.9	
REP					1,983	1.1	▲0.5
BP					995	0.5	▲0.4
GRAUEN					451	0.2	▲0.2
Feminist					393	0.2	▲0.1
PBC					354	0.2	▲0.1
BüSo					82	0.0	0.0
MLPD					60	0.0	
Informal votes		2,530			2,420		
Total valid votes		184,793			184,903		
Turnout		187,323	76.2	▼4.4			
CSU hold	Majority	81,141	43.9				
