= Theo Berger =

Bavarian criminal

Theo Maximilian Berger
- Born: 25 January 1941; Ludwigsmoos, Bavaria, Nazi Germany
- Died: 20 November 2003 (aged 62); Straubing, Bavaria, Germany
- Cause of death: Suicide by hanging
- Resting place: Alter Friedhof, Neuburg an der Donau
- Known for: Prison sentences and escapes
- Criminal charge: Bank robbery Armed robbery Attempted murder Car theft
- Criminal penalty: Sentenced to 137 years in jail
- Spouse: ? (1991–2001, her death)
- Children: Five (two deceased)

Theo Maximilian Berger (25 January 1941 – 20 November 2003) was a notorious Bavarian criminal, best known for his numerous escapes from prison. Despite escaping four times, Berger spent 39 years in jail and eventually committed suicide there. Berger had been sentenced to a collective 137 years in jail.

In 1986, he became the subject of a documentary titled Der Al Capone vom Donaumoos (English: The Bavarian Al Capone) and later wrote his memoirs, which were smuggled out of Straubing prison. In 2006, he also became the subject of a theatre play in Neuburg an der Donau titled Bruchstücke (English: Shards).

In his time, Berger received a number of nicknames, among them Al Capone vom Donaumoos, König der Ausbrecher (English:King of the jail breakers) or Der schöne Theo (English:The beautiful Theo). He was at times compared to some of the other legendary Bavarian criminals and robbers, the Räuber Kneißl and the Bayerische Hiasl.

== Biography ==
Berger was born in 1941 in Ludwigsmoos, a small village near Schrobenhausen in what is now the district of Neuburg-Schrobenhausen. He was the son of a farmer. He was the second of nine sons. One of his brothers was later shot by the police.

Berger was described as of a rebellious nature in school, hitting back at the local village priest when he tried to discipline him. Shortly after turning 18, Berger was sentenced to three years in jail for minor offences, in the belief that it would break him. Berger's punishment, in retrospect, was seen as far too harsh for his early crimes and resulted in him developing a hatred for the authorities. After his release he was re-arrested within four months, this time for car theft. Later attempts to start a non-criminal life failed, being accused of theft when he was innocent, lacking a drivers' licence to carry out his job and finding his wages confiscated to pay for his illegitimate children. In 1965, Berger escaped from the local police station in Schrobenhausen after having been arrested for a fight by jumping out of a window on the first floor, stealing a bicycle and cycling to Ludwigsmoos, where friends cut off his handcuffs.

In 1968, Berger was sentenced to 15 years in prison for bank robbery, which he was to spend in the high-security jail at Straubing. He quickly came to realise that Straubing was not as secure as its reputation, as he himself was able to carry a hacksaw in his suitcase on arrival. He used this hacksaw for his first escape, when on transfer in Munich. He was confronted by the police in March 1969 and arrested after firing and injuring a police officer. Berger later claimed in his memoirs that the hate with which he was prosecuted by the police made him fire at the officers.

He returned to his home area, the Donaumoos, after this escape despite this being the most searched place by the police. Berger's life, by his own admission, was always moving between the Moos and prison. Berger was cleverly able to evade the police and earned secret admiration and support for this. The home of his family in Ludwigsmoos became a tourist attraction. However, after his shots at a police officer in 1969, Berger did lose a lot of support in the region. His admirers saw in him somebody that took from the rich and never actually killed anyone.

Berger was often purposely playing cat-and-mouse with the police. He would call up the local police station and inform them that he had just stolen a car, was going to refuel it and then was ready to be chased.

After each escape, Berger was caught eventually and his court cases, held in Augsburg, became pilgrimages for the local population from the Donaumoos. By his own admission in his memoirs, Berger was always able to receive keys for his cell in Straubing and a gun when he wanted. He even once toyed with the idea of passing a gun to the Red Army Faction terrorists Knut Folkerts and Bernd Rößner after seeing them in the courtyard of the Straubing jail. He eventually handed in his guns to the Bavarian justice department in the hope of being allowed to receive medical treatment outside of jail; he was refused.

He made his fourth escape in September 1983, when he escaped through a toilet window as part of a group of inmates who visited the Straubing Zoo. His escape lasted for only eleven days; he was arrested without resisting on a bridge over the Danube in Ingolstadt, afraid the police would shoot him otherwise.

Berger, in his later life in prison, suffered from a rare form of blood cancer. By 1989, his weight had dropped to 60 kg and he suffered from speech impediments because of long periods of isolation. He was released from prison in 1985 because of his illness, but Berger and accomplices Otto Hinterlechner were the main suspects in a bank robbery in March 1986. The two were eventually confronted by the police and arrested after a shootout with the police.

While Berger could not be convicted of this bank robbery, the fact that shots were fired at the police resulted in him being charged with attempt of murder. He was sentenced to another 12 years in prison despite not having fired a shot from his gun. Hinterlechner, who originally stated that Berger told him to fire, later withdrew this statement. A psychological assessment of Berger at the time found that he suffered from excessive masculinity, a lack of scruple when it came to aggression and a complete absence of fear for retribution by others. On top of his 12-year sentence, it was decided that Berger should remain in preventive detention for the rest of his life. In 1989, when his father died, Berger was allowed to attend the funeral, but he was guarded by 20 police officers and a police helicopter.

When Berger's wife died in 2001, he was allowed to attend the funeral but was escorted by three police officers and was not allowed to spend time with his family. In his later days in jail, Berger felt that he was sentenced to death in jail, despite the death penalty having been abolished in Germany in 1949. Hubert Dietl, a high-ranking official in the Bavarian justice department, once declared that Berger should die in jail since he was a danger to the public. Berger never publicly showed regret for his crimes, but an inmate in his final years stated that Berger had changed and was much calmer and unlikely to be threat to anybody anymore.

== Death ==
After 39 years in jail, Berger committed suicide by hanging himself in Straubing prison on 20 November 2003. The appropriateness of Berger's 36 years in jail was questioned in his obituary by the Sueddeutsche Zeitung, as he never killed anybody and even murderers in Germany tend to be released after much shorter sentences. Berger was buried at the Alten Friedhof in Neuburg an der Donau.

== Personal life ==
While in prison in 1991, Berger married a teacher from Karlshuld. She made four unsuccessful appeals to have Berger pardoned, and she died in 2001. Berger had five children with three different women; two of the children died as infants. The surviving three children are all daughters.

Berger's daughter Michaela, who regularly visited him throughout his time in jail, made numerous attempts to have her father released and to have him live with her and her children. Shortly before his suicide, plans were underway to permit Berger to spend one day a week at his daughter's house.

== In popular culture ==
- Berger's life was the subject of a 1986 German documentary The Bavarian Al Capone by Oliver Herbrich. The 59-minute documentary features Theo Berger as one of the coauthors and actors. The film was seen as too controversial for Bavarian public television, but it was shown in cinemas in Augsburg and the Donaumoos. For broadcast in West German Television (WDR) the film needed to be subtitled in High German. In 2018 the film was digitally remastered and successfully re-released.
- in 1989, his autobiography Ausbruch (English: Escape) was published and 10,000 copies were sold.
- In 2006, Berger became the subject of a theatre play in Neuburg an der Donau titled Bruchstücke. It became the most successful play in the history of theatre in Neuburg. However, the play was not uncontroversial; it was seen by some of his victims as an undeserved glorification of a criminal.
