= Battle of Neuburg (1800) =

Battle of the War of the Second Coalition

- Part of the War of the Second Coalition
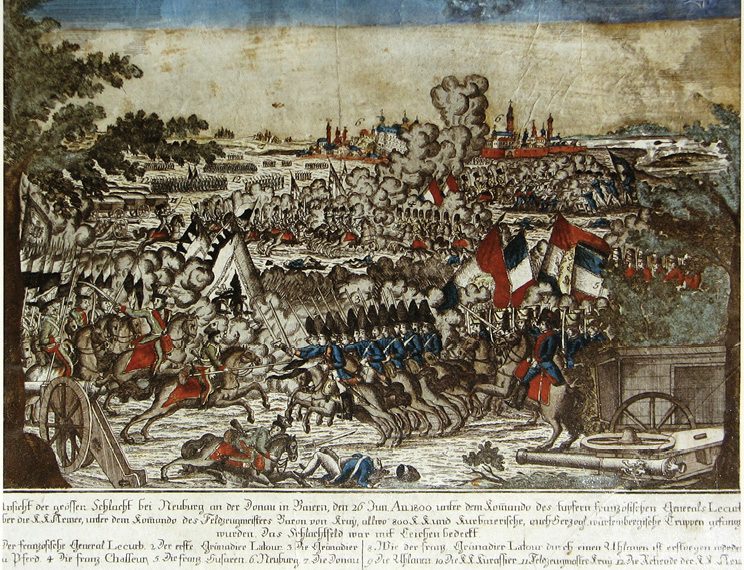
- Contemporary engraving of the Battle of Neuburg, now at Neuburg Castle
Date	27 June 1800
Location	Neuburg an der Donau 48°43′0″N 11°5′0″E
Result	French victory

Belligerents
France	(Holy Roman Empire) Austria

Commanders and leaders
Claude Lecourbe	Pál Kray

Strength
11,000	8,000

Casualties and losses
Approximately 800 killed or wounded; 200 captured	700 killed or wounded; 600 captured

War of the Second Coalition:
Austria
The color black indicates the current battle.

The Battle of Neuburg occurred on 27 June 1800 in the south German state of Bavaria, on the southern bank of the Danube river. Neuburg is located on the Danube between Ingolstadt and Donauwörth. This battle occurred late in the War of the Second Coalition (1798–1802), the second war between Revolutionary France and the conservative European monarchies, which included at one time or another Britain, Habsburg Austria, Russia (until late 1799), the Ottoman Empire (Turkey), Portugal and Naples. After a series of reverses, several of the allies withdrew from the Coalition. By 1800, Napoleon's military victories in northern Italy challenged Habsburg supremacy there. French victories in the upper Danubian territories opened a route along that river to Vienna.

In a series of battles in what is now southern Germany, the French pushed the combined Austrian and Coalition force back, first capturing Stockach, then Meßkirch, then Biberach. After his loss at Biberach, the Coalition commander Pál Kray withdrew to the fortress at Ulm, leaving detachments to secure the Danube crossings that lay further to the east, at Höchstädt, Blindheim, Donauwörth, and Neuburg. The battle at Neuburg was the last of the Danube campaign for the summer of 1800; the armistice between the Habsburgs and the French was signed a couple of days later and ended in late November, and the French ultimately defeated the Austrians at the battles at Ampfing and Hohenlinden. The heaviest action of the battle occurred in the village of Unterhausen, in the outskirts of Neuburg.

== Background ==
By early 1799, the French Directory had become impatient with stalling tactics employed by Austria. The uprising in Naples raised further alarms, and recent gains in Switzerland suggested the timing was fortuitous to venture on another campaign in northern Italy and southwestern Germany. At the beginning of 1800, the armies of France and Austria faced each other across the Rhine. Feldzeugmeister Pál Kray led approximately 120,000 troops. In addition to his Austrian regulars, his force included 12,000 men from the Electorate of Bavaria, 6,000 troops from the Duchy of Württemberg, 5,000 soldiers of low quality from the Archbishopric of Mainz, and 7,000 militiamen from the County of Tyrol. Of these, 25,000 men were deployed east of Lake Constance (Bodensee) to protect the Vorarlberg. Kray posted his main body of 95,000 soldiers in the L-shaped angle where the Rhine changes direction from a westward flow along the northern border of Switzerland to a northward flow along the eastern border of France. Unwisely, Kray set up his main magazine at Stockach, near the northwestern end of Lake Constance, only a day's march from French-held Switzerland.

=== Strategic importance of Danube Valley ===
The French war goal, to occupy Vienna and force the Habsburgs to accept and comply with peace terms established in 1798, required a double-pronged invasion through northern Italy, which First Consul Napoleon commanded, and through southern Germany, a campaign that fell to Moreau. To secure access into Bavaria and, eventually, to Vienna, the French needed to control the Danube riverway. This was not a new tactic: The stretch of river between Ulm and Neuburg had been the site of major battles of the Thirty Years' War and War of the Spanish Succession. Between Ulm and Ingolstadt, the Danube grows significantly in volume, making it a wide and swift waterway. The Iller joins the Danube at Ulm, dumping massive amounts of water into the stream; at Donauwörth, the Lech enters the Danube. Neuburg, the first significant city on the river after Donauwörth, had been the family seat of the princes of Pfalz-Neuburg; taking it from a princely family of the Holy Roman Empire would be a blow to the morale and prestige of the Habsburgs, whose role it was to protect the small princely domains. Control of the bridges and passages between Ulm and Donauwörth, Neuburg, then Ingolstadt offered an advantage of both transport and prestige.

=== Preliminary to battle ===
After withdrawing from Biberach, Kray waited at Ulm for Moreau's assault, which did not come. Instead of striking directly at the well-fortified and supplied city, Moreau's first division, approaching Ulm from the south, suddenly veered to the east and struck at the smaller forces posted between Ulm and Donauwörth. Its commander, Claude Lecourbe, secured posts in Landsberg and Augsburg, and left sufficient rearguard troops to protect himself from Prince Reuss-Plauen, who remained in the Tyrol guarding mountain access to Vienna. Lecourbe then approached Dettingen, Blindheim (Blenheim) and Höchstädt. The corps of General Paul Grenier had been posted with its right flank to the Danube and Gunzburg, and their left flank at Kinsdorf. General Richepanse protected both shores of the Iller, covering the road from Ulm south to Memmingen, and secured communication with Switzerland; there, he withstood considerable skirmishing with the Austrians. Three divisions of reserve remained at the hamlets of Kamlack and Mindel, to support an attack made by General Lecourbe on Ulm, in a case it should succeed, or Grenier's attack upon Günzburg, in case Lecourbe should not succeed. At the battle at Höchstädt, a full Austrian corps maintained possession until dislodged by repeated attacks of carabiniers, cuirassiers and hussars, who took about 2,000 of the Austrians and Württembergers as prisoners, along with some cannons and standards. Once Höchstädt and its nearby bridges fell on 19 June, the French controlled the Danube crossings between Ulm and Donauwörth. Kray abandoned Ulm, and withdrew further downstream. The next French target would be Neuburg.

== Orders of battle ==
=== French ===
The exact order of battle of French forces is not clear, but contemporary sources suggest the presence of a portion of General Claude Lecourbe's Corps of 28,368, including the forces of generals Laval, Molitor, Jardon, and Vandamme. This is also confirmed in an extract of Moreau's dispatch to the French Minister of War, published in the London Chronicle, 10 June 1800. "The 6th Chasseurs, 13th Cavalry, 4th Hussars and 11th Chasseurs distinguished themselves in this affair. The rest of the division, and that of [Lecourbe], passed rapidly [along] the Danube...General Grenier was equally well prepared." In addition, the presence (and death) of Théophile Corret de la Tour d'Auvergne, the First Grenadier of France, suggests that the grenadier company of the 46th Demi-brigade infantry de ligne was at least engaged. In addition, General Espagne's 37th and 84th Regiments were engaged, as were grenadiers the 109th Regiment. Lecourbe mentions the 37th and the 109th several times in his own account of the battle, so apparently they were heavily engaged: this would include the brigades of François Goullus and François Bontemps.

==== Lecourbe's Division, Armée du Danube ====
Lecourbe's division was reformed in April 1800 while still in Switzerland. After the Battle of Messkirch, both Gouvion Saint-Cyr and Sainte-Suzanne had retired to the Rhine, taking many of their forces with them. Consequently, Moreau had assigned had the cavalry commanded by Jean-Joseph Ange d'Hautpoul to reinforce Lecourbe's division. Based on the mentions in the dispatches and Lecourbe's reconstituted division, portions of the following probably were either present or available:

- General of Division Dominique Vandamme, Generals of Brigade Jardon, Laval, Molitor:
  - First Demi-Brigade de Légère (Note: The French Army designated two kinds of infantry: d'infanterie légère, or light infantry, to provide skirmishing cover for the troops that followed, principally d’infanterie de ligne, which fought in tight formations.)
  - 36th 83rd, 94th Demi-Brigades de Ligne
  - 8th Hussar Regiment
- Total 9,963 infantry, 540 cavalry
- Generals of Brigade François Goullus and François Bontemps
  - 10th Demi-Brigade de Légère
  - 37th, 84th 109th Demi-Brigades de Ligne
  - 36th 93rd, 94th Regiments de Ligne
  - 9th Hussars
- Total 8,238 infantry, 464 cavalry
- General of Division Montrichard and General of Brigade Joseph Augustin Fournier
  - 10th Demi-Brigade de Légère
  - 38th, 67th Regiments de Ligne
- Total 6,998
- General of Division Étienne Marie Antoine Champion de Nansouty
  - Combined Grenadiers, 25th Cavalry, 11th Dragoons, 12th Chàsseurs
- Total 1,500 infantry, 1,280 cavalry

=== Austrian ===
The Austrian force included:

- FZM Baron von Kray, Commanding
  - Infanterie Regiments Wenkheim #35, Erbach # 42 (battalions each)
  - Kür Regiment Lothringen #7, Hohenzollern # 8, Kinsky #12 (6 squadrons each)
  - Dragoon Regiment Latour #11 (6 squadrons)

Total Austrian force: 8,000 men.

== Battle ==
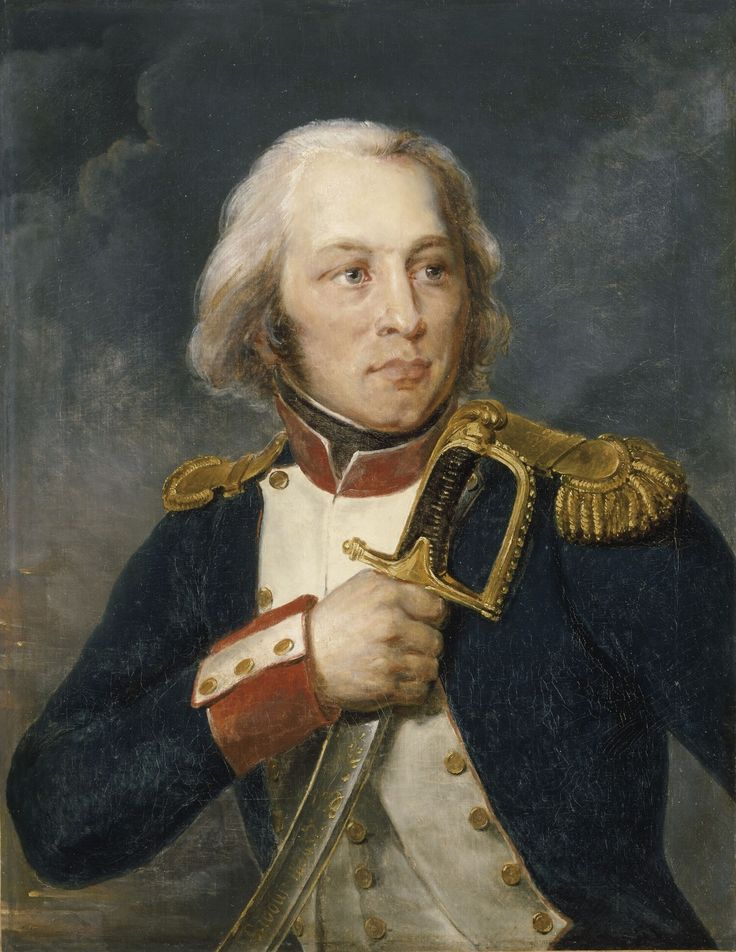
Claude Jacques Lecourbe commanded the French assault at Neuburg.

On 26 June 1800, Kray's force held the remaining passages across the Danube between Neuburg and Inglostadt. On that morning, the divisions of Gudin and Montrichard marched toward the junction of the Danube and Lech rivers from Donauwörth. General Gudin's division followed a southward track toward Pöttmes and established a line north to Ehekirchen, approximately 5 kilometres (3 mi) (roughly along what is now road 2035). Montrichard's division, the 10th Demi-Brigade de Légère and the 38th and 67th Regiments de Ligne marched toward Neuburg, which he was instructed to occupy with his right wing connecting to Gudin's and covered the road between Augsburg and Neuburg. Gudin's division encountered some resistance before it could take possession of Pöttmes, but succeeded with several charges executed by the 6th and 8th Hussars, who also captured 100 horses from the Austrians. General Puthed, who commanded the brigade on General Gudin's left, took control of Ehekirchen with little opposition.

General Montrichard's division approached Neuburg on the causeway that ran parallel to the river and took possession of the outskirts of the city with little problem. Kray's troops, joined with Prince Reuss-Plauen and emerged from Neuburg to defend the outskirts. Both Austrian forces were unprepared for battle at the moment, which allowed Montrichard's troops to penetrate within four miles of the city with little opposition. Espagne's brigade supported the advance guard, and after a brief action took the heights of Oberhausen with the 37th and the 84th Regiments. By early afternoon, the Austrians had recovered the village of Niederhausen, but the village of Unterhausen remained in French hands, defended by 100 marksmen, portions of the 37th Regiment and the 1st company of grenadiers of the 109th regiment.

From this point on, combat centered on the village of Unterhausen, 6 km (3.7 mi) west-south-west of Neuburg center. A few French platoons drove the Austrians from the forest located between the village and the Danube with a bayonet charge by the grenadiers of the 109th. As French reserves arrived, the Austrians counterattacked and retook the woods, the heights at Oberhausen, and the village. According to Lecourbe's account, the Austrians, "embolden by this first success, soon covered all the surrounding heights, on which they planted about twenty-five or thirty pieces of cannon." At eight o'clock at night, after twelve hours of battle, companies of the 14th and 46th Regiments (French) moved along a small road on the right of the village, and another group proceeded on the left, enveloping the village. The subsequent simultaneous French attack at both flanks and the center convinced the Austrians that, despite the defensive barrages laid by their artillery in Oberhausen, the French had been massively reinforced. The attack on the village, executed without firing a shot, involved fierce hand-to-hand fighting in which the commander of the 46th Regiment and the First Grenadier of France, Latour D'Auvergne, were both killed. (Note: Sources are unclear about the name of the commander of the 46th prior to the battle; in July 1800, Moreau appointed Louis-François Lanchantin as commander; he was promoted to colonel in 1804. See (in French) A. Lievyns, Jean Maurice Verdot, Pierre Bégat, Fastes de la Légion-d'honneur, biographie de tous les décorés accompagnée de l'histoire législative et réglementaire de l'ordre . Paris: Bureau de l'administration, 1847, p. 545. See also Tony Broughton, FINS, French Infantry Regiments and the Colonels who Led Them: 1791 to 1815 Part V: 41e - 50e Regiments. Napoleon Series.org. Accessed 17 November 2014.)

Outside the village, the French 46th and 14th Light Infantry mingled in combat with the Austrian cavalry, yet managed to hold their own, presumably in squares. This melee continued until about 2200, when the Austrians withdrew from Unterhausen. Lecourbe ordered his troops not to pursue, as nightfall was on them.

== Aftermath ==
The battle had immediate implications. General Ney established his headquarters in the castle at Neuburg, which overlooks the battlefield. General Moreau ordered the establishment of a tomb on the location where the First Grenadier had fallen. Emperor Francis II dismissed Pál Kray, who had lost an impressive succession of battles, and appointed his brother, the 18-year-old general major Archduke John, to command the Austrian army. To compensate for John's inexperience, the emperor named FZM Franz von Lauer as deputy commander and the zealous Oberst (Colonel) Franz von Weyrother became chief of staff.

In the broader scheme, the series of battles beginning with the losses at Stockach and Engen and ending at Neuburg broke the Austrian control along the strategic Danube. Similarly, in Italy, French successes at the battles at Montebello and Marengo forced Austrian withdrawal to the east. With France threatening Habsburg Austria from the northwest and southwest, the Austrians agreed to a cease fire. Subsequent peace negotiations were complicated by the alliance Austria had made with Britain, and which prevented her from signing any separate peace. The British entered the negotiations to bolster their weakened ally. Initially Britain, which had successfully blockaded French ports, refused the French terms and offered counter terms in September 1800. Napoleon later claimed that the Austrians did not negotiate in good faith, and sought only to gain time until "the rainy season" (winter), when army movements would be difficult, and the Habsburgs would have an entire season to recruit.

== Sources ==
- Arnold, James R. Marengo & Hohenlinden. Barnsley, South Yorkshire, UK: Pen & Sword, 2005. ISBN 978-0967098500
- Beattie, Andrew. The Danube: A Cultural History. Oxford University Press, 2010. ISBN 9780199768356
- Blanning, Timothy. The French Revolutionary Wars, New York, Oxford University Press. ISBN 978-0340569115
- Broughton, Tony. FINS, French Infantry Regiments and the Colonels who Led Them: 1791 to 1815 Part V: 41e - 50e Regiments. Napoleon Series.org. Accessed 17 November 2014.
- Dumas, Mathieu, Memoirs of his own time: including the revolution, the empire, and the restoration, Volume 2, Lee and Blanchard, 1839. OCLC 733090540
- Eggenberger, David. "Höchstädt II", An Encyclopedia of Battles, Dover Publications, 2014. OCLC 564339074
- Gaspard, Baron Gourgaud, editor, Memoirs of the History of France during the reign of Napoleon I, Oxford, 1823. OCLC 191763
- (in French) Lievyns, A., Jean Maurice Verdot, Pierre Bégat, Fastes de la Légion-d'honneur, biographie de tous les décorés accompagnée de l'histoire législative et réglementaire de l'ordre . Paris: Bureau de l'administration, 1847. OCLC 3903245
- Macgowan, J. The Field of Mars,: Being an Alphabetical Digestion of the Principal Naval and Military Engagements, in Europe, Asia, Africa, and America ... from the Ninth Century to the Peace of 1801 G. and J. Robinson, 1801, un-numbered pages. Battlefields listed alphabetically. No oclc number available for this edition.
- Smith, Digby, Napoleonic Wars Databook. London: Greenhill Press, 1998. ISBN 1-85367-276-9.
- Thiers, Marie Joseph L. Adolphe, J. Stapleton trans. Thiers' History of the consulate, and empire of Napoleon, London : Houlston & Stoneman, [1845?], OCLC 46896676.
- Van-Es, Willem Lodewyk, The Life of Napoleon Buonaparte ...: With a Concise History of the Events W. Day, 1810. OCLC 15446266
