= Polytan =

- Company type: GmbH
- Industry: Sport surfaces
- Founded: 1970
- Headquarters: Burgheim, Germany
- Key people: Gregor Gaisböck, Mathias Schmidt
- Revenue: € 300 million (2022)
- Owner: Sport Group Holding GmbH
- Number of employees: 550 (2023)
- Website: www.polytan.com

Polytan GmbH is a German manufacturer of artificial turf systems and synthetic sport surfaces. It is based in Burgheim, Bavaria, and is a subsidiary of Sport Group Holding GmbH.

== History ==
Polytan was founded in 1970 as Firl + Schretter Sportstättenbau in Neuburg an der Donau and, initially, installed polyurethane-bound in-situ synthetic surfaces for sports facilities.

In 1995, Polytan started to develop synthetic turf systems and acquired a production facility for synthetic turf and polyurethane in Grefrath (North Rhine-Westphalia).

In 2003, a coating and extrusion plant for synthetic turf was installed at the production facility in Grefrath. In the same year, the company acquired a FIFA license to be able to provide turfs for official games. As organisations as FIFA and UEFA increasingly accepted artificial turfs for professional sports in the 2000s, Polytan installed turfs in stadiums and arenas in various countries.

From 2007 to 2009, Polytan bought production and installation companies in Australia, Germany and France.

In 2019, the first sustainable artificial turf, LigaTurf Cross GT zero, was introduced. Since ECHA has proposed a ban on the synthetic application of microplastics, which is still being discussed by the EU Commission, in 2020, Polytan has started to put additional effort into developing and installing sustainable tracks and turf systems made from recycled materials and Brazilian sugarcane.

With Poligras Paris GT zero, Polytan developed the world's first CO_{2}-neutral artificial turf for the field hockey arena for the 2024 Olympic Games in Paris.

== Products ==
Polytan manufactures, distributes and installs high-speed tracks, all-weather courts, tennis courts and shock-absorbent surfaces, as well as synthetic turf systems and multifunctional playing fields.

Polytan has been producing and installing CO_{2}-neutral artificial turfs since 2019. The LigaTurf Cross GT zero is used for professional training facilities, amateur and professional clubs, sports schools and municipal sports facilities. Poligras Paris GT zero is a CO_{2}-neutral artificial turf used for field hockey.

== Company Structure ==
Polytan GmbH is a wholly owned subsidiary of Sport Group Holding. The managing directors of Polytan GmbH are Gregor Gaisböck and Mathias Schmidt. Polytan has 550 employees (as of 2023) and achieved revenue of 300 million euro in 2022.

Polytan's headquarters are in Burgheim, with additional locations in Berlin and Halle. An additional location is in France (Polytan France). Outside Europe, Polytan has branches in Melbourne (Australia), Hong Kong and Wellington (New Zealand).
