= Unterhausen =

Unterhausen may refer to the following locations in Germany:

- Unterhausen, Bavaria, a formerly independent municipality which became part of Oberhausen in 1972
- Unterhausen, Baden-Württemberg, a formerly independent municipality which became part of Lichtenstein in 1975

== Notes ==
Unterhausens are often located near an Oberhausen.
