= Oberhausen (near Neuburg) =

- Municipality
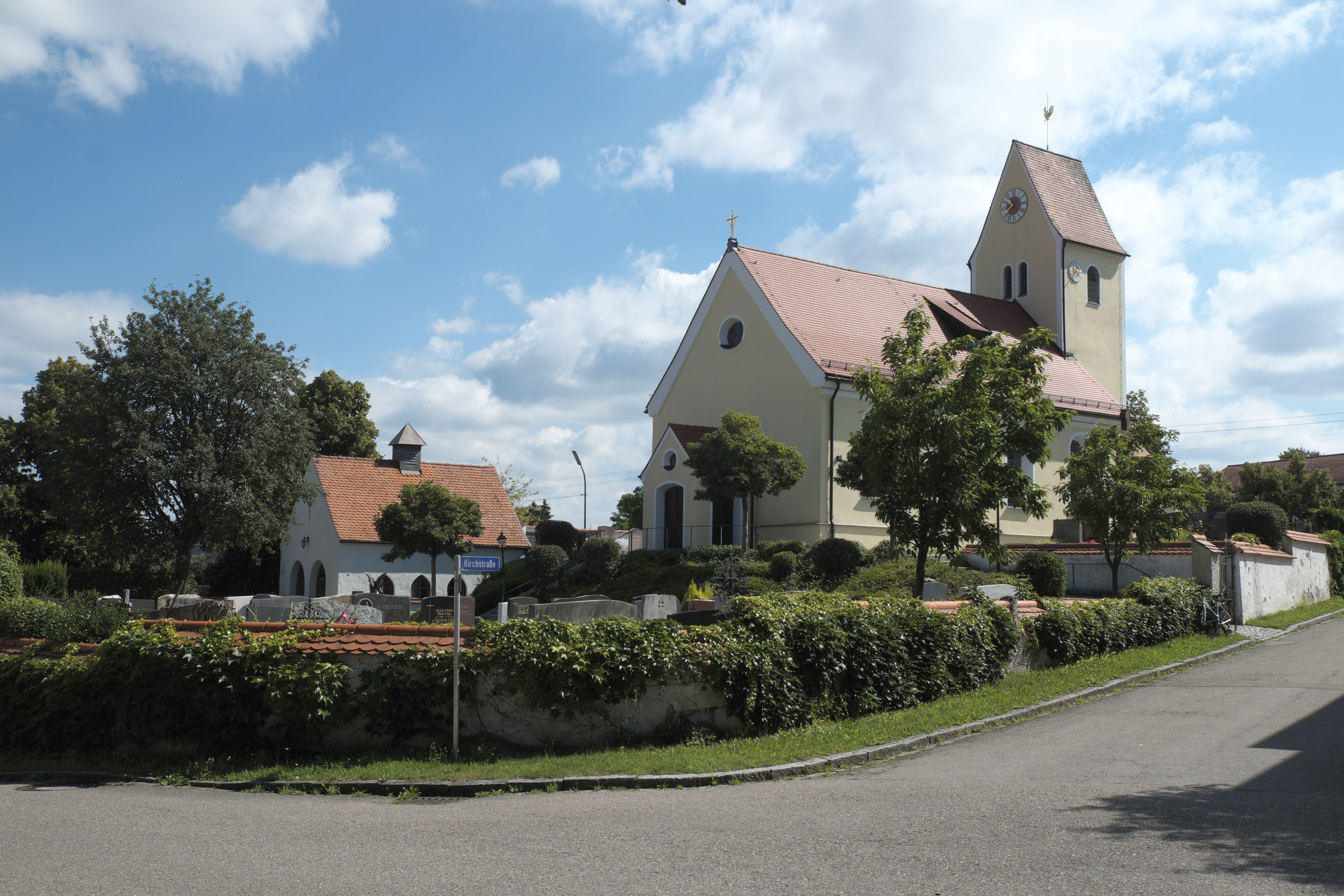
- Church of Saint Clemens

- Coat of arms

- Location of Oberhausen within Neuburg-Schrobenhausen district
- Interactive map of Oberhausen
- Location within Germany Location within Bavaria
- Coordinates: 48°43′N 11°7′E
- Country: Germany
- State: Bavaria
- Admin. region: Oberbayern
- District: Neuburg-Schrobenhausen

Government
  - Mayor (2020–26): Fridolin Gößl (CSU)

Area
  - Total: 32 km^{2} (12 sq mi)
- Elevation: 420–445 m (1,378–1,460 ft)

Population (2025-12-31)
  - Total: 3,231
  - Density: 100/km^{2} (260/sq mi)
- Time zone: UTC+01:00 (CET)
  - Summer (DST): UTC+02:00 (CEST)
- Postal codes: 86697
- Dialling codes: 08431
- Vehicle registration: ND
- Website: https://oberhausen-donau.de/

Oberhausen (German pronunciation: [ˈoːbɐhaʊzn̩]; Central Bavarian: Obahausn) is a municipality in the Neuburg-Schrobenhausen district in the state of Bavaria in Germany.

Oberhausen combines historic Oberhausen, Unterhausen, Sinning and Kreut.

Neighboring communities include Rennertshofen, Burgheim, Ehekirchen, Rohrenfels, Königsmoos and Neuburg an der Donau.

Bahnhof Unterhausen is the local train station.

== Population ==
The population as of January, 2005:

municipality total	2,618
Oberhausen	1,079
Sinning	781
Unterhausen	722
Kreut	36

== History ==
In 1214, Oberhausen and Unterhausen were documented.

There were heavy casualties and great damage to Oberhausen and Unterhausen during World War II. In the woods just outside Sinning, there are reinforced, concrete bunkers built during World War II that still exist today.

In 1972, Oberhausen, Unterhausen and Sinning were combined under the name Oberhausen. In 1994, Kreut was added to the municipality.

== The four communities ==
Oberhausen is made up of Oberhausen, Unterhausen, Sinning, Kreut.

=== Oberhausen ===
Oberhausen was first documented in 1214.

=== Unterhausen ===
Grumoldshausen or Grünwaldshausen oder Grimoldshausen, the original name of Unterhausen, was created in the 8th century.

=== Sinning ===
Sinning was first documented in 1176.

=== Kreut ===
Kreut joined the municipality in 1994.
