= Hütting =

- Part of Rennertshofen
- Interactive map of Hütting
- Location within Germany Location within Bavaria
- Coordinates: 48°47′54″N 11°6′38″E
- Country: Germany
- State: Bavaria
- Municipality: Rennertshofen

Area
  - Total: 15.19 km^{2} (5.86 sq mi)
- Elevation: 396 m (1,299 ft)

Population (2022)
  - Total: 277
  - Density: 18.2/km^{2} (47.2/sq mi)
- Time zone: UTC+01:00 (CET)
  - Summer (DST): UTC+02:00 (CEST)
- Postal codes: 86643
- Dialling codes: 08427

Hütting is a parish village, part of the market municipality of Rennertshofen, in the district of Neuburg-Schrobenhausen, in the region of Upper Bavaria, Germany.

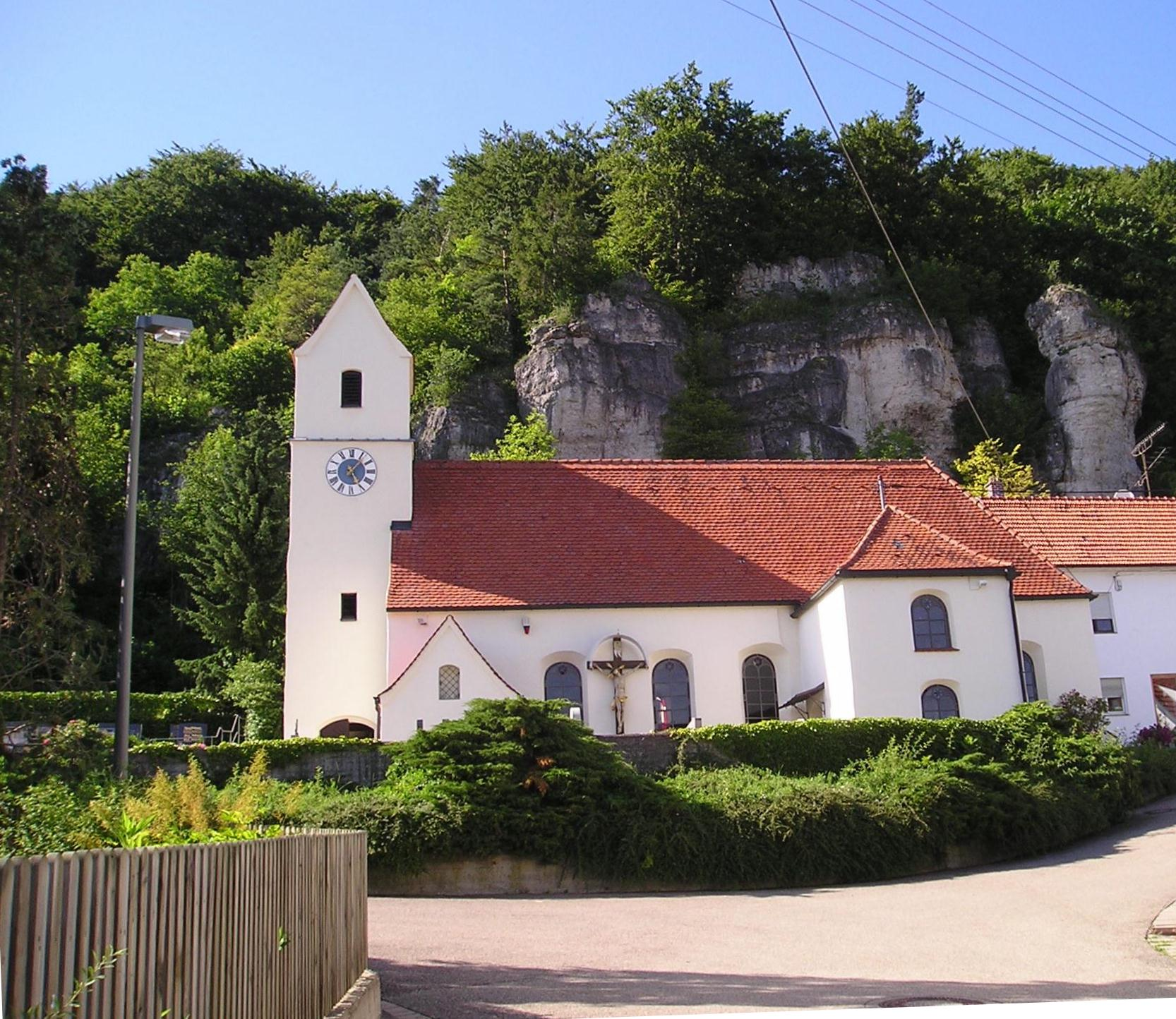
St. Sixtus church at Hütting

== Geography ==
Hütting is located north-east of the main town of Rennertshofen in the Wellheim Valley, in the middle of a hilly/rocky landscape of the Southern Franconian Mountains.

The village is built at the foot of tall rock formations. The valley below is useful for agriculture and forestry.

== History ==
There is archeological evidence of human habitation around Hütting going back to the late Stone Age and Bronze Age.

There are also remains of a Roman estate in the area.

Hütting Castle was built in 1060 at the top of a high rock formation overlooking the village. The village and castle was first mentioned in a document in 1256 by the inhabitants of the castle, the Lechsgemünd Family, calling themselves the 'Lords of Hütting'.

In 1342, Hütting Castle and the village fell to the Wittelsbach family dynasty.

For several hundred years, the Wittelsbach Dukes of Bavaria repeatedly used the castle as a pledge, (allowing other noble houses to live in the castle in return for performing various obligations). The castle was burned down during the 1420-1422 Bavarian War and then abandoned. The ruins of a tower are still visible today on Hütting's highest peak.

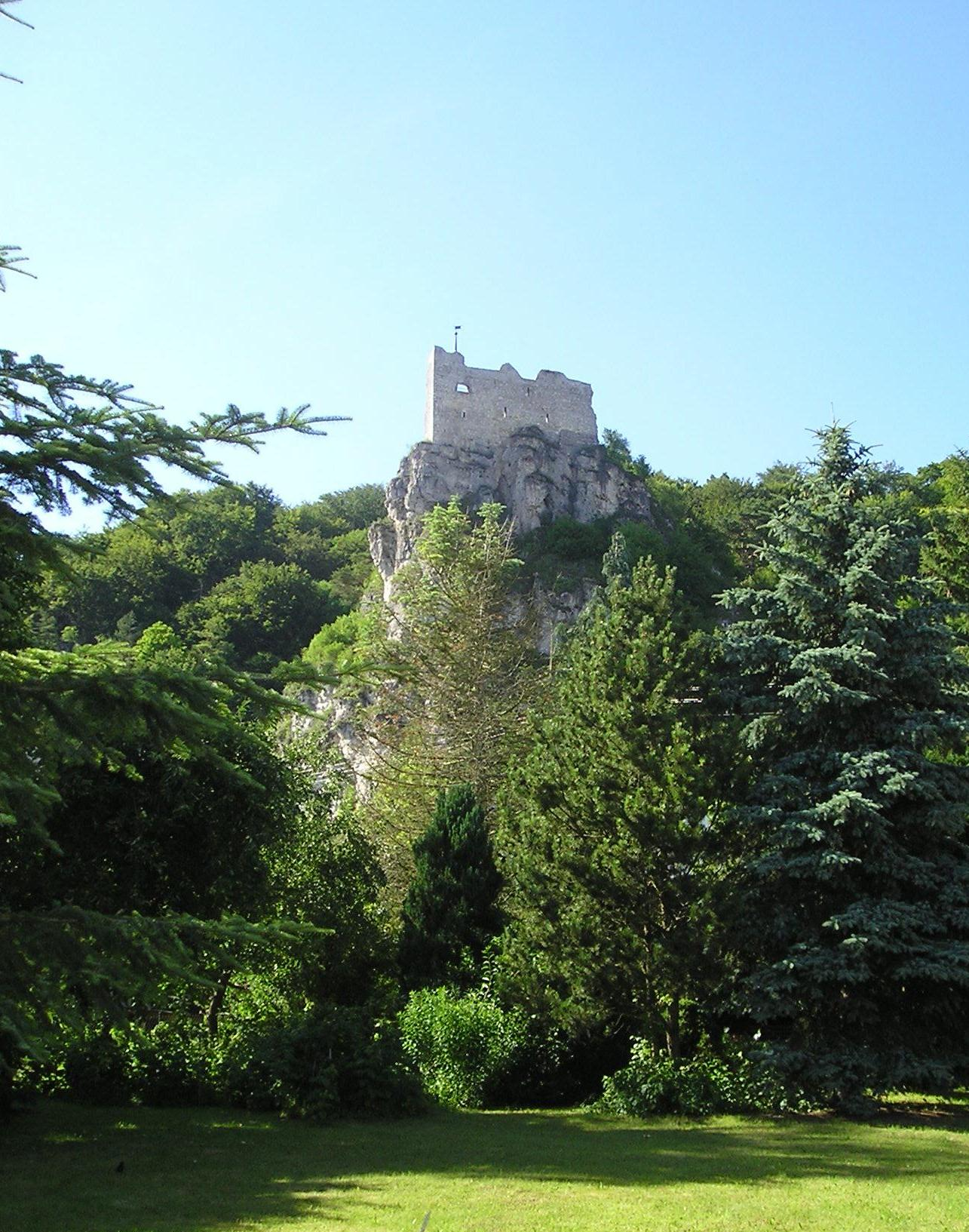
Ruins of Hütting Castle

The local village catholic church, St. Sixtus, was built during the second half of the 17th century in Baroque Revival architecture. Possibly there was an earlier church but it may have been destroyed during the Thirty Years War.

Since the 19th century, the noble 'House von Redwitz' has been living in the Hütting area.

Since the 1970s, Hütting has been under the jurisdiction of the district of Neuburg-Schrobenhausen.

A train line was built through Hütting in the 1990s.

In 2017 Hütting celebrated 140 years of its Fire-Fighting Unit (Feurwehr).

== Sources ==
- Statistisches Bundesamt (ed.): Historisches Gemeindeverzeichnis für die Bundesrepublik Deutschland. Namens-, Grenz- und Schlüsselnummernänderungen bei Gemeinden, Kreisen und Regierungsbezirken vom 27. 5. 1970 bis 31. 12. 1982. W. Kohlhammer GmbH, Stuttgart und Mainz 1983, ISBN 3-17-003263-1, p. 602
- Adam Horn and Werner Meyer: Die Kunstdenkmäler von Bayern, Regierungsbezirk Schwaben, Band V., Stadt und Landkreis Neuburg a. d. Donau. München 1958, pp. 513–517. ISBN 3486505165
