= Neuburg an der Donau (Verwaltungsgemeinschaft) =

- Verwaltungsgemeinschaft
- Location of Neuburg an der Donau within Neuburg-Schrobenhausen district
- Interactive map of Neuburg an der Donau
- Location within Germany Location within Bavaria
- Coordinates: 48°44′N 11°11′E
- Country: Germany
- State: Bavaria
- Admin. region: Upper Bavaria
- District: Neuburg-Schrobenhausen
- Seat: Neuburg an der Donau
- Subdivisions: 2 municipalities

Area
  - Total: 46.45 km^{2} (17.93 sq mi)

Population (2025-12-31)
  - Total: 3,665
  - Density: 78.90/km^{2} (204.4/sq mi)
- Time zone: UTC+01:00 (CET)
  - Summer (DST): UTC+02:00 (CEST)
- Website: www.vg-neuburg.de

Neuburg an der Donau is a Verwaltungsgemeinschaft (municipal association) in the district Neuburg-Schrobenhausen in Bavaria, Germany. Its seat is in Neuburg an der Donau, itself not part of the Verwaltungsgemeinschaft.

It consists of the following municipalities:

1. Bergheim
2. Rohrenfels
