= Reinhard Brandl =

German politician (born 1977)

Reinhard Brandl MdB
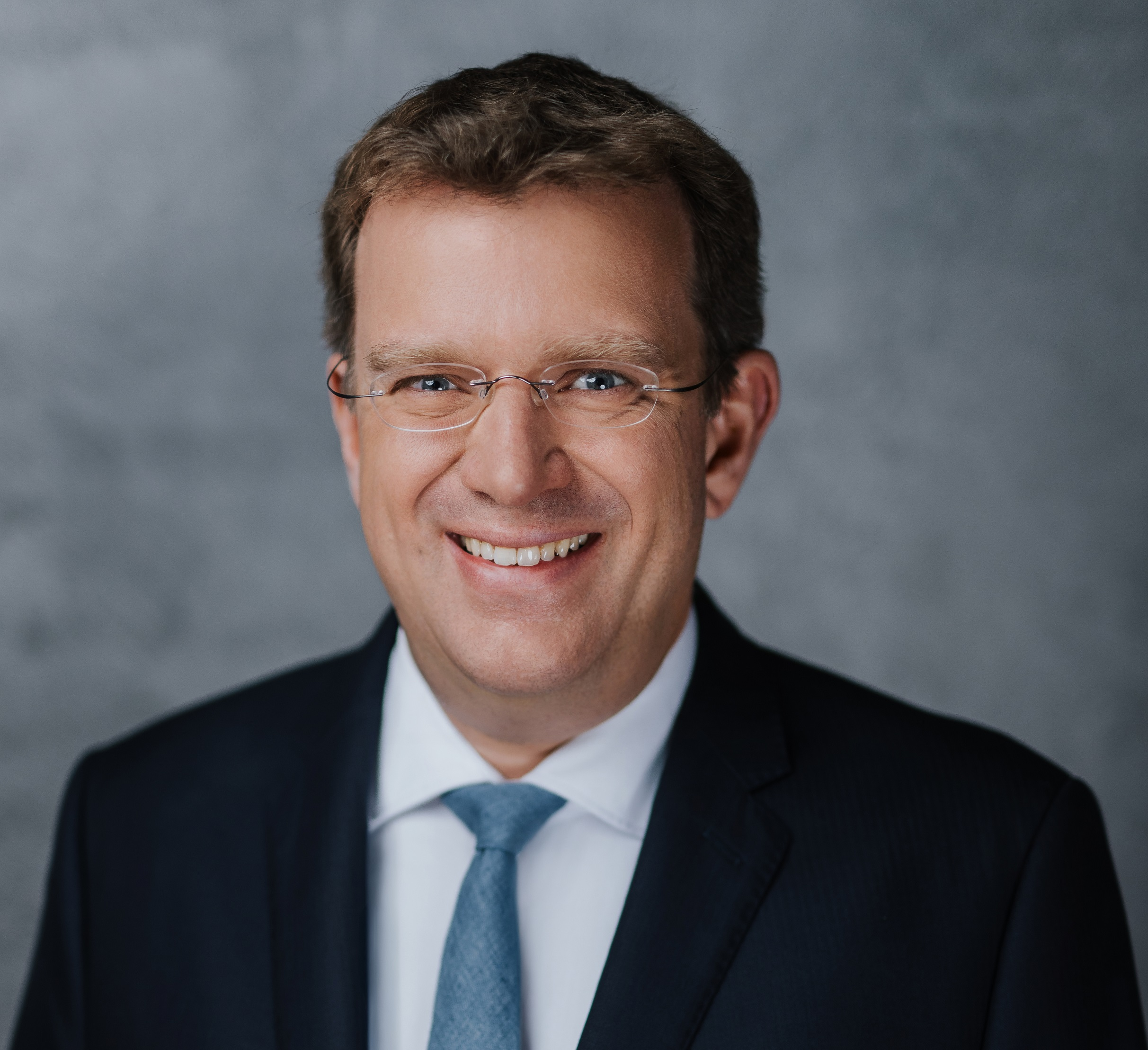
- Brandl in 2025

Member of the Bundestag; for Ingolstadt
- Incumbent
- Assumed office 27 October 2009
- Preceded by: Matthäus Strebl

Personal details
- Born: 11 August 1977 (age 49) Ingolstadt, West Germany
- Party: Christian Social Union
- Children: 2
- Education: University of Karlsruhe; Grenoble INP; TU Munich

Reinhard Brandl (born on 1 August 1977) is a German politician from the Christian Social Union (CSU). He has been a Member of the German Bundestag since 2009, and has served as Parliamentary Secretary of the Bundestag group of CSU parliamentarians since May 2025.

== Life and career ==
Brandl grew up in the small municipality of Eitensheim in Altmühltal Nature Park. After obtaining his Abitur (higher-education entrance qualification) at Willibald-Gymnasium Eichstätt in 1996, he completed compulsory military service with the Air Force in Manching-Oberstimm. He then studied at the University of Karlsruhe, graduating as an industrial engineer in 2003. He also holds a qualification as an Ingénieur en génie industriel from the French Institut National Polytechnique de Grenoble. He worked for BMW in Munich from 2003 to 2006.

He obtained his doctorate (Dr. rer. nat.) at the Department of Informatics of the Technical University of Munich in 2007. From 2007 to 2008, he was a member of the management board of the family-owned business Erhard Brandl Dipl-Ing in Eitensheim. In 2009, he worked as a business consultant for the Boston Consulting Group in Munich until his election to the Bundestag.

He chairs CSUnet, the party’s working group on internet policy, and is a member of the CSU party executive.

== Personal life ==
Brandl is Catholic, married, and has two sons.

== German Bundestag ==
In the 2009 Bundestag election, Brandl won the Ingolstadt constituency seat with 57.2 per cent of the first votes. The seat had previously been held from 1980 to 2008 by Horst Seehofer, former CSU chairman and Bavarian Minister-President. Brandl was re-elected with 61.5 per cent of the first votes in the 2013 Bundestag election, 49.5 per cent in 2017, and almost 45 per cent of the first votes in the 2021 election.

In the 2025 Bundestag election, Brandl successfully defended his seat, winning 47.1 per cent of the first votes in the Ingolstadt constituency. That was the third-best result in terms of first votes in Bavaria, and the best in Upper Bavaria. This meant that he was re-elected to the German Bundestag in the 21st electoral term. On 5 May 2025, the Bundestag group of CSU parliamentarians elected him as its new Parliamentary Secretary. He took over from Alexander Hoffmann, the newly elected chairman of the Bundestag group of CSU parliamentarians. Brandl is also a member of the Bundestag’s Council of Elders and the Joint Committee of the Bundestag and Bundesrat.

== Activities ==
He chairs the supervisory board of AININ, an alliance of several universities and groups for the purpose of researching cutting-edge technologies. Brandl has been a member of the board of the Association for Security Policy (GSP) since 2014 and Vice-President of the GSP since 2019; he has been a member of the Association of the German Army since at least 2018.

== Other activities ==
- Catholic University of Eichstätt-Ingolstadt, Member of the Board of Trustees (since 2025)
- Foundation for Data Protection, Member of the advisory board (since 2022)
- Federal Network Agency for Electricity, Gas, Telecommunications, Post and Railway (BNetzA), Alternate Member of the advisory board (since 2022)
- Nuclear Waste Disposal Fund, Member of the Board of Trustees (since 2017)
- Bundesverband eMobilität (BEM), Member of the Parliamentary Advisory Board
- Gesellschaft für Sicherheitspolitik (GSP), Vice President
- German Federal Film Board (FFA), Alternate Member of the supervisory board (since 2018)
- Federal Agency for Civic Education, Member of the Board of Trustees (2009–2013)
