= Théophile Corret de la Tour d'Auvergne =

French officer (1743–1800)

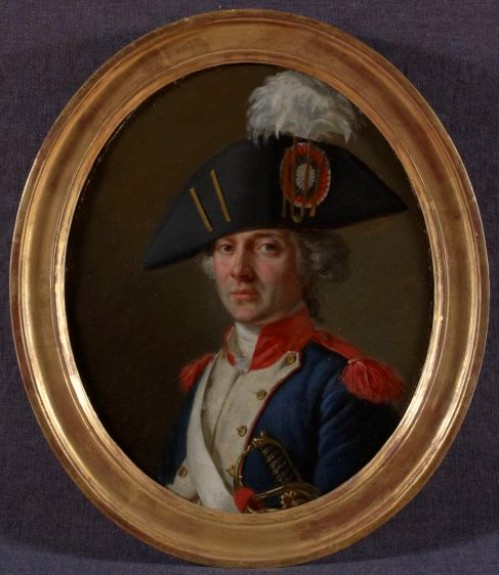
Portrait in the Musée de la Révolution française

Théophile Malo Corret de la Tour d'Auvergne (French pronunciation: [teɔfil malo kɔʁɛ də la tuʁ dovɛʁɲ]; 23 November 1743 – 28 June 1800) was a French officer named by Napoleon as the "first grenadier of France". He was also a celtomaniac antiquarian who introduced the words "dolmen" and "menhir" into general archaeological usage.

== Career ==
He was the son of a lawyer named Corret, and was certainly baptised and perhaps born at Carhaix-Plouguer in Brittany, though nearby Saint-Hernin where his father had a position is one of a number of other places in the area put forward as his place of birth. His desire for a military career being strongly marked, he was enabled by the not uncommon device of producing a certificate of nobility signed by his friends, first to be nominally enlisted in the Maison du Roi, and soon afterwards to receive a commission in the line, under the name of Corret de Kerbaufret. Four years after joining, in 1771, he assumed with the help of a letter from the Duke of Bouillon the surname of La Tour d'Auvergne, claiming descent from an illegitimate half-brother of the great Marshal Henri de la Tour d'Auvergne, Vicomte de Turenne, one of Louis XIV's leading commanders. Many years of routine service with his regiment were broken only by his participation as a volunteer in the Duke de Crillon's Franco-Spanish expedition to Menorca in 1781. This led to an offer of promotion into the Spanish army, but he refused to change his allegiance.

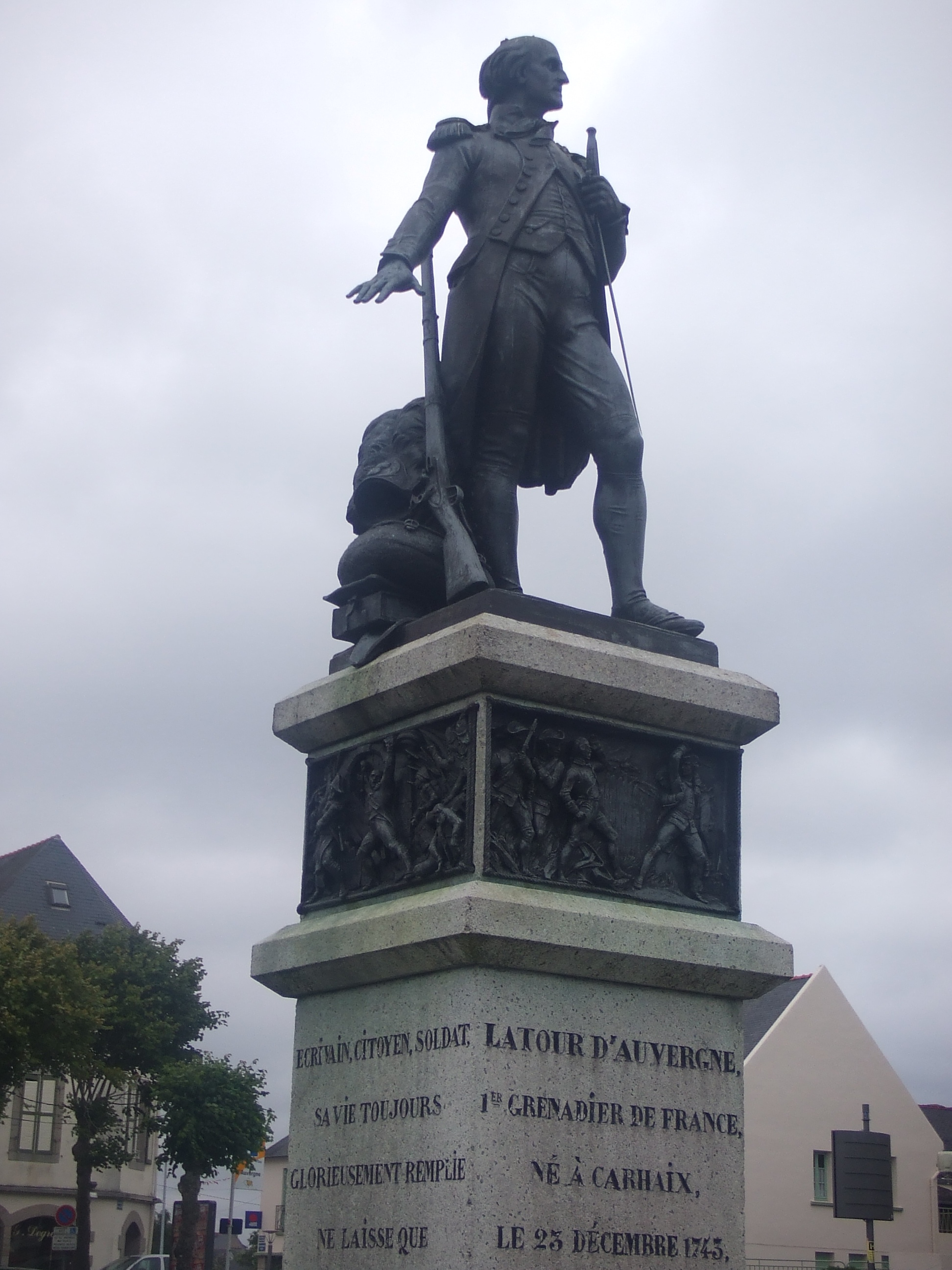
Statue of de la Tour d'Auvergne in Carhaix

In 1784 he was promoted captain, and in 1791 he received the Cross of St. Louis. In the early part of the French Revolution his patriotism was still more conspicuously displayed in his resolute opposition to the proposals of many of his brother officers in the Angoumois regiment to emigrate rather than to swear to the constitution, and he fought in the revolutionary army in the French Revolutionary Wars, refusing promotion beyond the grade of captain. In 1792 his lifelong interest in numismatics and questions of language was shown by a work which he published on the Bretons. At this time he was serving under Montesquiou in the Alps, and although there was only outpost fighting he distinguished himself by his courage and audacity, qualities which were displayed in more serious fighting in the Pyrenees the next year. He declined well-earned promotion to colonel, and, being broken in health and compelled, owing to the loss of his teeth, to live on milk, he left the army in 1795.

On his return by sea to Brittany he was captured by the English and held prisoner for two years. When released, he settled at Passy and published Origines gauloises (1796). In 1797, on the appeal of an old friend whose son had been taken as a conscript, he volunteered as the youth's substitute, and served on the Rhine (1797) and in Switzerland (1798–1799) as a captain. In recognition of his singular bravery and modesty Corret obtained a decree from Napoleon naming him the "first grenadier of France" (27 April 1800). This led him to volunteer again, and he was killed in action at the Battle of Neuburg on 27 June 1800.

== Memory ==
La Tour d'Auvergne's almost legendary courage had captivated the imagination of the French soldier, and his memory was not allowed to die. It was customary for the French troops and their allies of the Rhine Confederation under Napoleon to march at attention when passing his burial place on the battlefield. His heart was long carried by the grenadier company of his regiment, the 46th. After being in the possession of Giuseppe Garibaldi for many years, it was finally deposited in the keeping of the city of Paris in 1883.

In 1800 Napoleon ordered, "His name is to be kept on the pay list and roll of his company. It will be called at all parades and a non-commissioned officer will reply, 'Mort au champ d'honneur.' " This custom, with little variation, is still observed in the 46th regiment on all occasions when the color is taken on parade. However, in early 1809, Napoleon himself put this tradition to an end. "What regiment has not had a general, a colonel, or finally, a brave man killed at its head? I have tolerated this singularity long enough" (Nap. Corr., vol 18, No. 14727). The urn was collected by the War Minister, showing that Napoleon preferred to celebrate the men who died to affirm his dynasty and build his Empire, rather than an individual whose association with the French Revolution was unmistakable.

== Sources ==
- Alain Schnapp, The discovery of the past, London: 1996.
