= Old Bavarian Donaumoos =

Coordinates: 48°40′N 11°13′E

Designations

Ramsar Wetland
- Official name: Donauauen & Donaumoos
- Designated: 26 February 1976
- Reference no.: 90

The Old Bavarian Donaumoos (German: Altbayerisches Donaumoos) is an old fen on the southern side of the Danube, southwest of Ingolstadt, Bavaria, in the Neuburg-Schrobenhausen district. The fen, drained from 1790 onwards, has now dropped 3 metres (9.8 ft) in surface level because of the drainage and associated environmental effects. The Donaumoos was once the largest area of fenland in Southern Germany.

It is one of two former fens named Donaumoos, the other being the Swabian Donaumoos (German: Schwäbisches Donaumoos), also predominantly located in Bavaria, between Ulm and Gundelfingen. Of the Bavarian fens, the Moose, 95 percent have been dried out, a trend the Bavarian government wishes to reverse by re-flooding some of the former fens.

== History ==
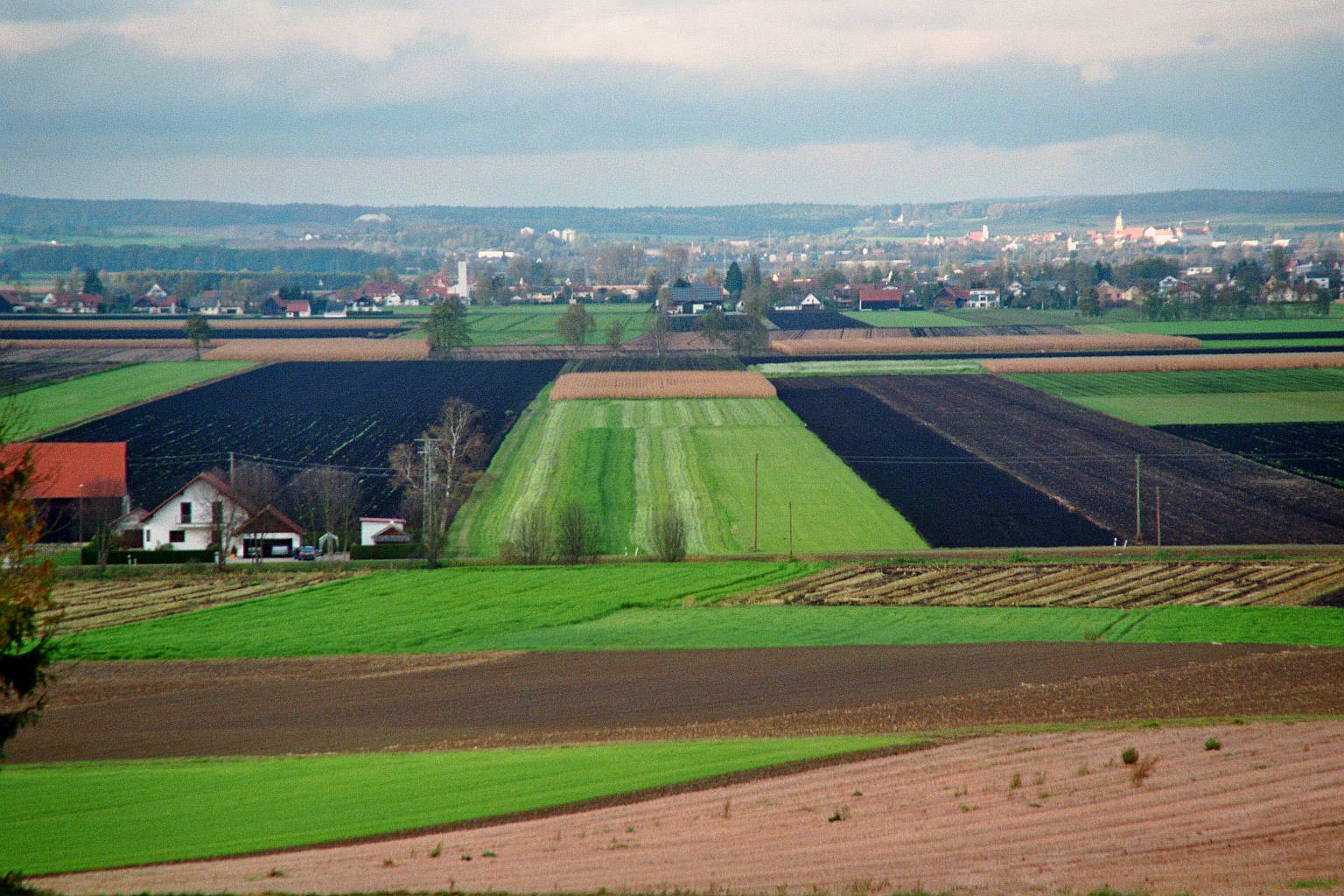
View of the Donaumoos

The Donaumoos was formed after the last glacial period, which ended approximately 10,000 years ago, in the wet lowlands on the southern side of the Danube (German: Donau). Over a period of time, peat was formed in the Donaumoos through the incomplete decomposition of plant materials. The peat formed at a rate of one millimetre per annum, to eventually reach a thickness of up to 10 metres in the Donaumoos.

Up until 1790, the 180 square kilometres of the Donaumoos fen were mostly inaccessible. From 1790 onwards, under the initiative of Charles Theodore, Elector of Bavaria, the fen was systematically drained. 473 kilometres of canals were built to drain the Donaumoos and, alongside the straight canals, villages were formed. Living conditions in the Moos were however difficult and new settlers for the region were hard to find.

To compensate for the later problem, the Bavarian government relaxed its long-standing policy of not allowing non-Catholics to live in Bavaria. In 1802, it permitted 120 Mennonite families to settle in the Danube fens. The new settlers were given numerous advantages, like subsidies, freedom from military service, tax-and rent-free use of the land for 10 years. Economic difficulties in the mid-1850s however forced the Mennonites to abandon their colony again and eventually emigrate to the United States.

Other Protestants - Lutherans and some reformed - settled in the Donaumoos to stay, however. As a result, in the 19th century there established three Protestant parishes in Karlshuld, Ludwigsmoos and Untermaxfeld, some of the very few existing in rural southern Bavaria before 1945. Apart from non-Catholics, the Bavarian government also recruited convicts to settle in the area.

The Moos was also home to one of Bavaria's most notorious criminals, Theo Berger (1941–2003), who was able to muster considerable support in the region during his four escape attempts from prison. Berger, who was the subject of a 1986 documentary, Der Al Capone vom Donaumoos (English: The Al Capone of the Donaumoos), was sent to a collective 137 years in jail and died in the Straubing prison in 2003.

== Environmental impact ==
The draining of the Donaumoos caused some drastic environmental side effects.

The dewatering of the peat causes mineralization and thereby a lowering of the level of the land. On average, one to two centimetres of height are lost annually. The dried-out peat becomes very fine and is prone to wind erosion. Additionally, in the early days, peat was used as a fossil fuel and mined in the Donaumoos.

All this has resulted in a number of problems. The Donaumoos is now three metres lower than it was in 1790. Of the 180 square kilometres (69 sq mi) of the fen, 60 have disappeared altogether. The dewatering canals have to constantly be lowered because of the drop of the surface level. However, where the canals join the Danube, this process has its limitations. Drainage from the Donaumoos to the river has slowed down and, after heavy rains, large areas of the Moos are flooded.

In 1991, the Donaumoos Zweckverband was formed, a public organisation which has the Regierungsbezirk Upper Bavaria, the district Neuburg-Schrobenhausen, the communities of Königsmoos, Karlshuld, Karlskron and Pöttmes as well as the local water departments as its members. A development plan was passed in 2000 with the aim of achieving a number of goals by 2030. Part of the plan is to preserve the Donaumoos as a habitat for people as well as flora and fauna.

Of the original character of the Moos, the peat fen, little is left. The remaining parts in the south and west of the Donaumoos, where the peat is still up to four metres thick, is to be protected and resupplied with water. Agricultural use of this area will not be possible anymore after this.
