= Heinrich Schlier =

Heinrich Schlier (Neuburg an der Donau on the Danube, 31 March 1900 – Bonn, 26 December 1978) was a theologian, initially with the protestant Church and later with the Catholic Church.

== Biography ==
Schlier was the son of a military doctor and attended the High School-Gymnasium in Landau and Ingolstadt, participated in World War I, and in 1919 studied Evangelical Theology at the university of Marburg, Leipzig and Jena. He received his doctorate in 1926 with his dissertation "Religious Historical Investigations into the Epistles of Ignatius" (published in 1929). From 1927, he served as pastor and teacher of the New Testament in Halle, Saxony-Anhalt and Wuppertal. From 1935, Schlier was part of the Confessing Church (German: Bekennende Kirche, BK), an opposition movement which arose in the Evangelical German Church against the attempt of the German Nazi regime to align the teaching and organisation of the Evangelical Church to Nazism. After the closing of the seminary in Wuppertal, he became pastor of the local community of the Confessing Church.

After the end of World War II, Schlier was again called to the chair of New Testament and the Early History of Christianity at the Theological Faculty of Bonn University. Over the years, however, he increasingly moved away from Protestantism, since he concluded that the Ecclesiological paradigms of the New Testament are anchored in the clearest way to Roman Catholicism. Consequently, Schlier in 1952 took a sabbatical, and, a year later, he converted to Catholicism. Concurrently he converted his pupil Uta Ranke-Heinemann, and in 1954 obtained a degree in Catholic theology at Munich.

Schlier was unable to obtain a professorship at the Faculty of Catholic Theology, since this was then reserved only for consecrated priests. Instead he became an Honorary Professor at the Faculty of Philosophy of the University of Bonn and was an active theological writer. Pope Paul VI called him to be in the Pontifical Biblical Commission. Pope Benedict XVI knew him and admired the subject's blending of scholarship and spirituality.

In addition, Schlier participated in the preparation of an official translation of the Bible and published it together with the Jesuit theologian Karl Rahner as series Quaestiones sentences.

Schlier died on December 26, 1978.
