= Hermann Aumer =

German politician (1915–1955)

Member of the Bundestag; for Ingolstadt
- In office 7 September 1949 – 6 October 1953
- Preceded by: Constituency established
- Succeeded by: Hans Demmelmeier

Personal details
- Born: 30 April 1915 Munich, Germany
- Died: 30 May 1955 (aged 40) Munich, West Germany
- Party: Independent (after 1950)
- Other political affiliations: Bavaria Party (1947–1950)

Hermann Aumer (30 April 1915 – 30 May 1955) was a German politician of the Bavaria Party (BP) and former member of the German Bundestag.

== Life ==
From 1949 to 1953, Aumer was a member of the German Bundestag for the Ingolstadt constituency for one term. During the occupation of Germany, he served as the Commissioner for Jewish Affairs in the Bavarian Ministry of the Interior. Aumer was removed from his position after U.S. occupation authorities discovered that he'd served as a vice-consul in Munich for the Romanian government of under Ion Antonescu.

In 1955, Aumer was sentenced to one year in prison for perjury. He killed himself shortly after the verdict.

== Literature ==
Herbst, Ludolf; Jahn, Bruno (2002). Vierhaus, Rudolf (ed.). Biographisches Handbuch der Mitglieder des Deutschen Bundestages. 1949–2002 [Biographical Handbook of the Members of the German Bundestag. 1949–2002] (in German). München: De Gruyter - De Gruyter Saur. p. 1715. ISBN 978-3-11-184511-1.
