= Hans Demmelmeier =

German politician and jurist (1887–1973)

Member of the Bundestag; for Ingolstadt
- In office 6 October 1953 – 17 October 1961
- Preceded by: Hermann Aumer
- Succeeded by: Paul Weinzierl

Member of the Landtag of Bavaria; for Upper Bavaria
- In office 11 December 1950 – 23 October 1953
- Preceded by: Multi-member district
- Succeeded by: Franz Heubl

Personal details
- Born: 1 May 1887 Angkofen, Germany
- Died: 5 September 1973 (aged 86) Pfaffenhofen an der Ilm, West Germany
- Party: Christian Social Union
- Other political affiliations: BVP (before 1933)

Hans Demmelmeier (1 May 1887 – 5 September 1973) was a German politician and jurist, representative of the Christian Social Union of Bavaria and Bavarian People's Party. He represented Ingolstadt in the Bundestag.

== See also ==
- List of Bavarian Christian Social Union politicians
