= Oberhausen (disambiguation) =

Oberhausen is a city in the Ruhr Area, Germany

Oberhausen may also refer to:

== Bavaria ==
- Oberhausen (near Neuburg), a municipality in the Neuburg-Schrobenhausen district
- Oberhausen, Weilheim-Schongau, a municipality in the Weilheim-Schongau district
- Augsburg-Oberhausen, a district in Augsburg

== Rhineland-Palatinate ==
- Oberhausen an der Appel, a municipality in the Donnersbergkreis
- Oberhausen an der Nahe, a municipality in the district of Bad Kreuznach
- Oberhausen bei Kirn, a municipality in the district of Bad Kreuznach
- Oberhausen, Südliche Weinstraße, a municipality in the district Südliche Weinstraße

== Belgium ==
- Oberhausen is an hamlet of the town Burg-Reuland
