= Neuburg Castle (Bavaria) =

Palace in Bavaria, Germany

Coordinates: 48.737°N 11.181°E

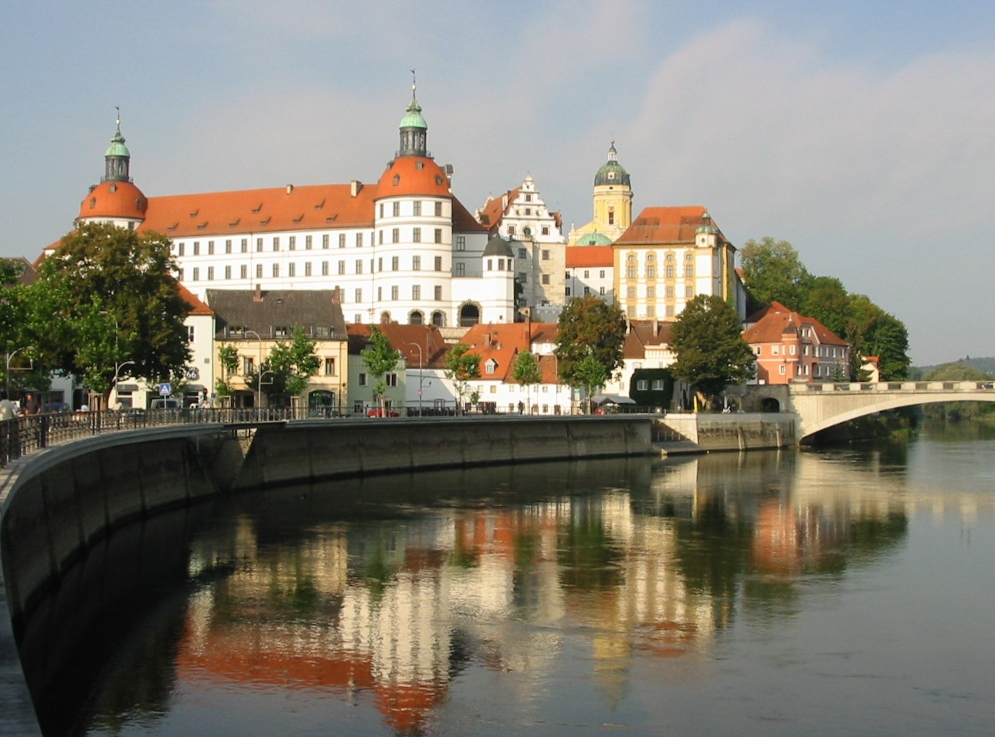
Neuburg Castle with river Danube

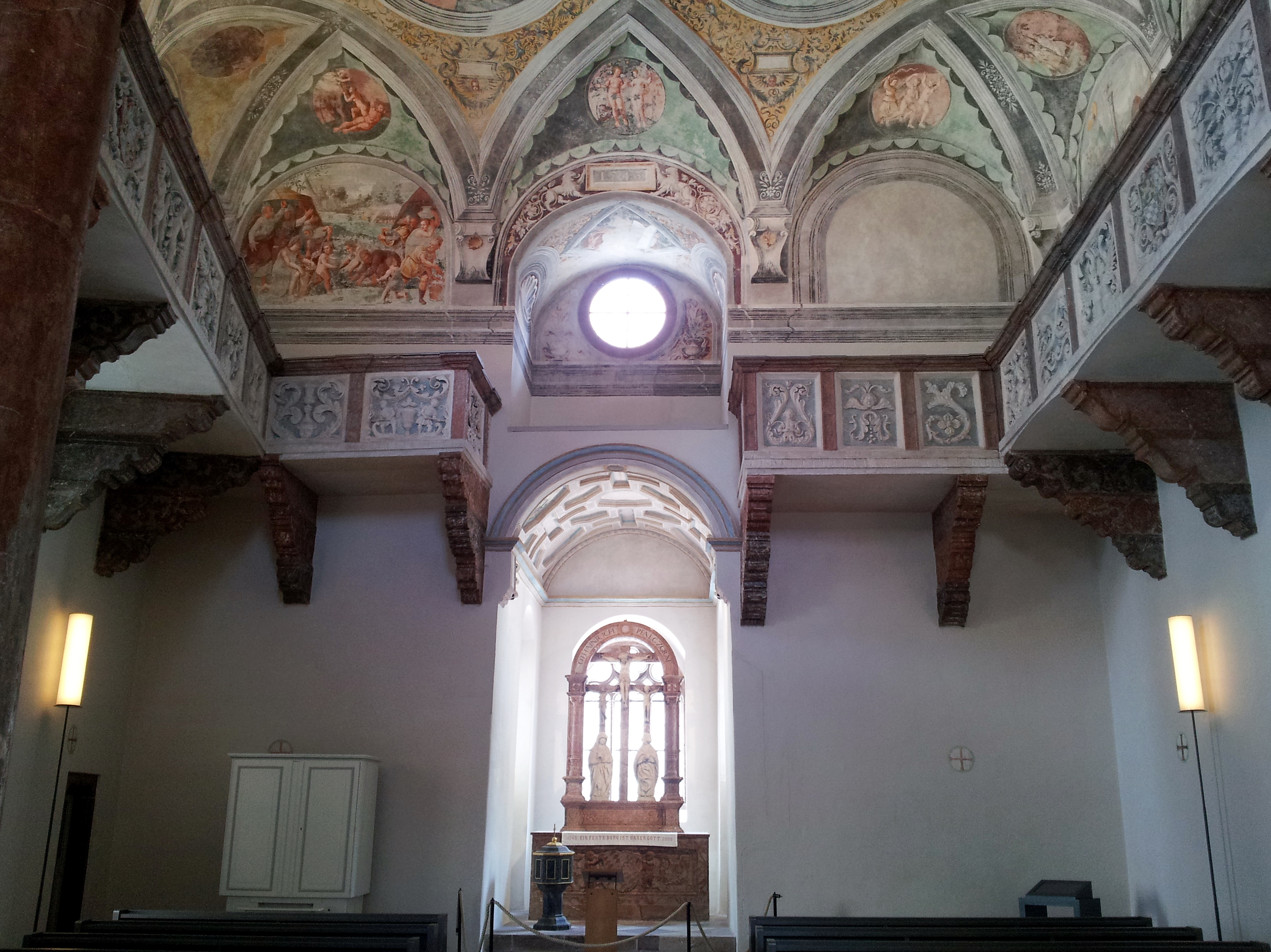
Court Chapel

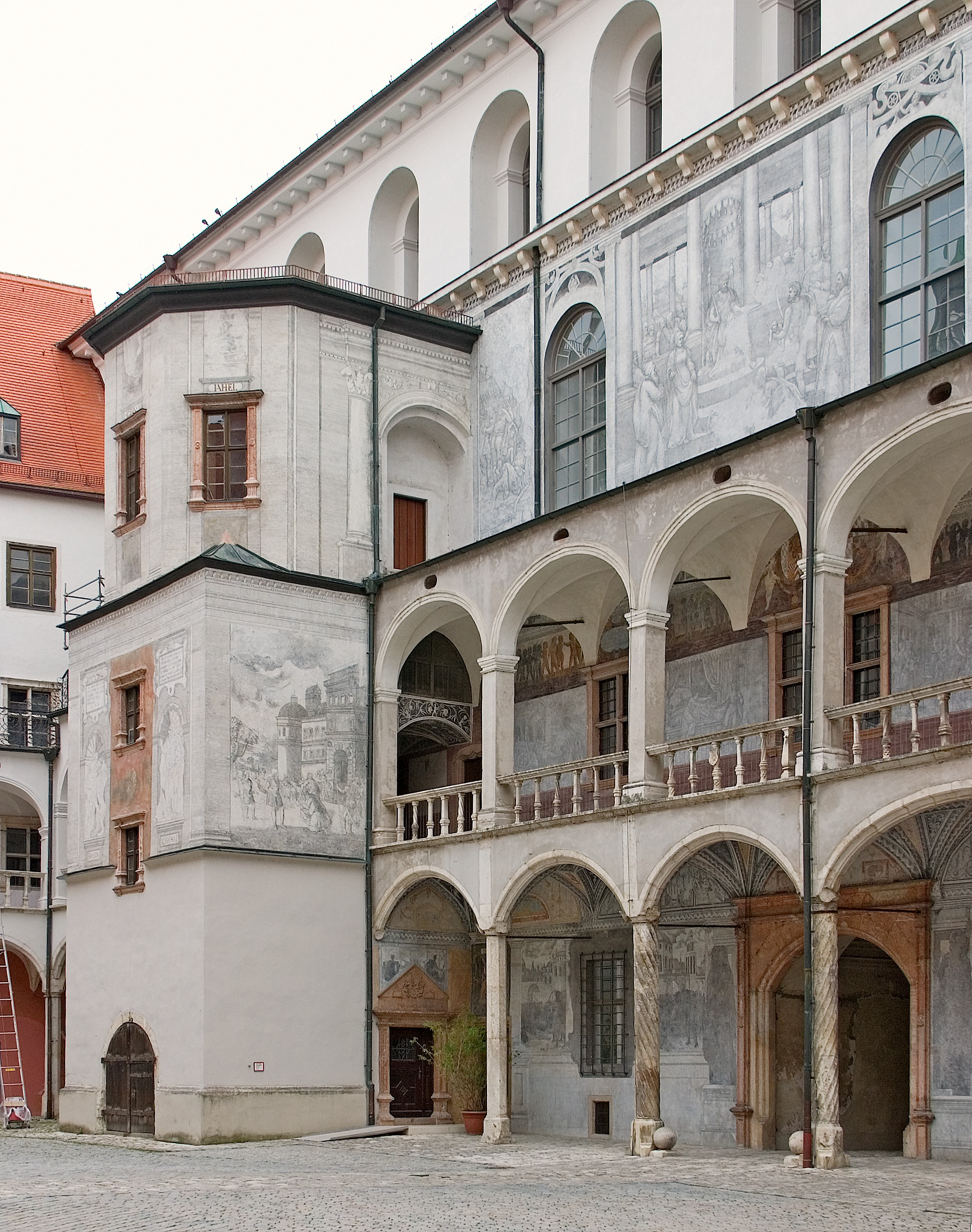
Courtyard with the wing completed in 1537

The Neuburg Castle (German: Schloss Neuburg) is a palace in Neuburg an der Donau, Upper Bavaria.

== History ==
The original castle was built in the early Middle Ages by the Agilolfings. This was acquired by the Wittelsbach dukes in 1247.

When Count Palatine Otto Henry began his rule in Palatinate-Neuburg in 1522, he found a medieval fortified castle in his residence city of Neuburg, which, unlike similar princely residences, was still not adjusted for the demands of a modern court. So from 1527, he ordered to re-design the castle into a Renaissance palace and to expand the artistic quality and condition to one of the most important palaces of the first half of the 16th Century in Germany. From 1537, an additional west wing was added which also includes the chapel.

The chapel is the oldest newly-built Protestant church in the world, although construction of the shell began as a Catholic court chapel in 1537, with a small apse, in which the altar with a crucifixion group, commissioned in 1540, is placed. In 1541, elector Otto Henry converted to the new Lutheran protestantism, and from 1542, the Salzburg church painter Hans Bocksberger der Ältere lavishly decorated the chapel with painted ceiling vaults and galleries in the latest antique-style Italian manner. The picture program not only thematized the decisive role of Christ as divine guarantor of grace, the central Lutheran doctrine. It also claims a decisive role of the prince in the distribution of this grace within a God-given earthly order. The court chapel was consecrated on 25 April 1543 by the reformed theologian Andreas Osiander. It was thus the first newly built Protestant church, an honor often attributed to the court chapel of Hartenfels Castle at Torgau which was built in 1443-44 and consecrated by Martin Luther on 5 October 1544.

Because of the financial difficulties and bankruptcy of Otto Henry in 1544, the construction of the west wing of the castle took a long time. Wolfgang, Count Palatine of Zweibrücken, who succeeded his cousin Otto Henry in the Duchy of Palatinate-Neuburg, ordered in 1562 to decorate the west wing facing the courtyard with elaborate Sgraffito decorations. The Knights' Hall (the lower panel room in north building) was provided in 1575 by Hans Pihel with a coffered ceiling and wall panels from a rotating timber, both of which are original. The impressive east wing was rebuilt in 1665 by Philip William, Elector Palatine in the Baroque style and complemented with two round towers.

Today the castle houses a gallery of baroque paintings, the museum is under supervision of the Bavarian State Picture Collection.

== See also ==
- Electoral Palatinate
- The Reformation and its influence on church architecture
