= Weichering =

- Municipality
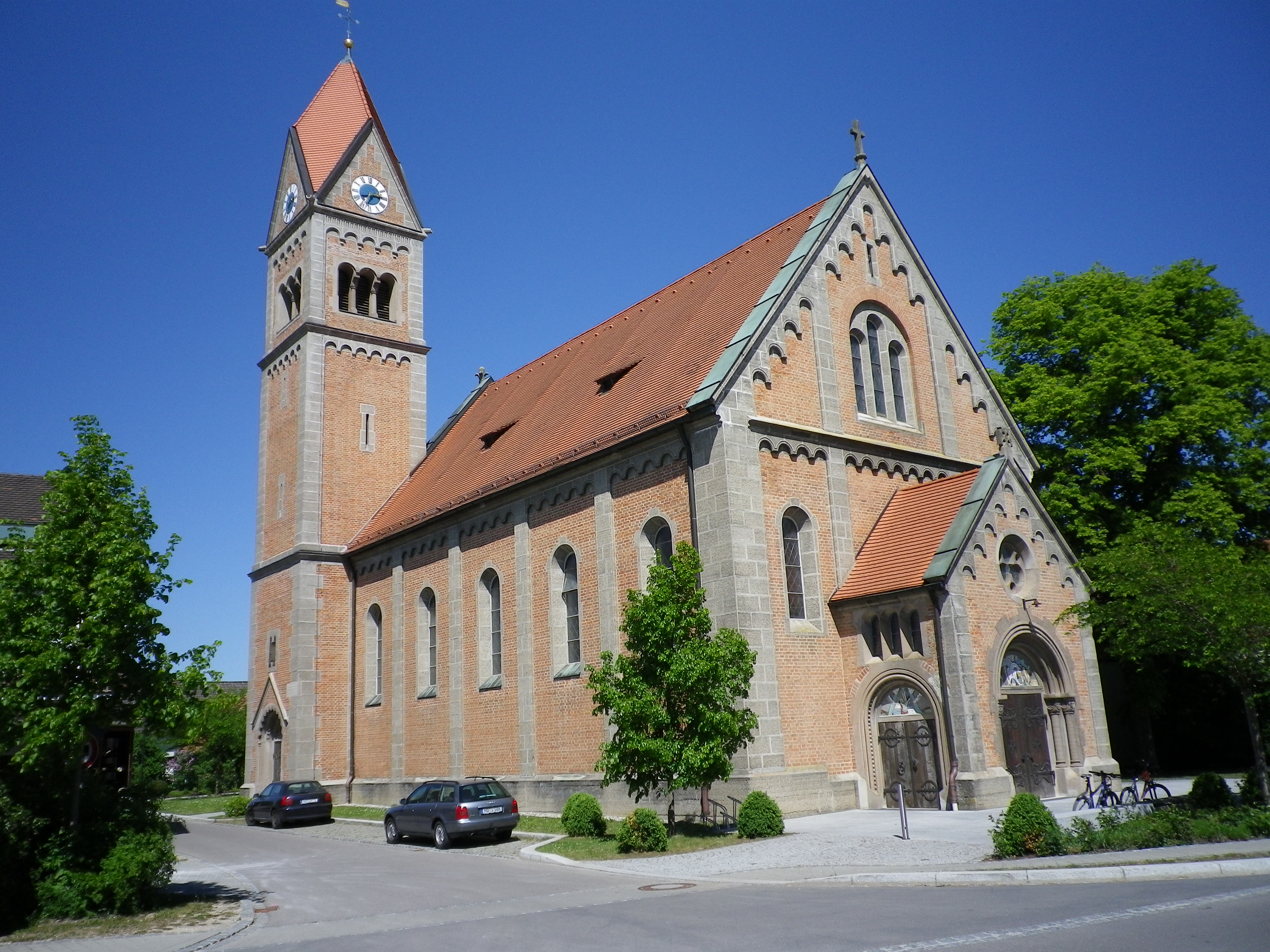
- Church of Saint Vitus

- Coat of arms

- Location of Weichering within Neuburg-Schrobenhausen district
- Interactive map of Weichering
- Location within Germany Location within Bavaria
- Coordinates: 48°43′N 11°19′E
- Country: Germany
- State: Bavaria
- Admin. region: Oberbayern
- District: Neuburg-Schrobenhausen

Government
  - Mayor (2020–26): Thomas Mack (CSU)

Area
  - Total: 24.59 km^{2} (9.49 sq mi)
- Elevation: 374 m (1,227 ft)

Population (2025-12-31)
  - Total: 2,395
  - Density: 97.40/km^{2} (252.3/sq mi)
- Time zone: UTC+01:00 (CET)
  - Summer (DST): UTC+02:00 (CEST)
- Postal codes: 86706
- Dialling codes: 08454
- Vehicle registration: ND
- Website: www.weichering.de

Weichering (German pronunciation: [ˈvaɪçəʁɪŋ]) is a municipality in the district of Neuburg-Schrobenhausen in Bavaria in Germany.

== People ==
Max Joseph von Pettenkofer was born in Lichtenheim.
