= Eva Bulling-Schröter =

German politician (born 1956)

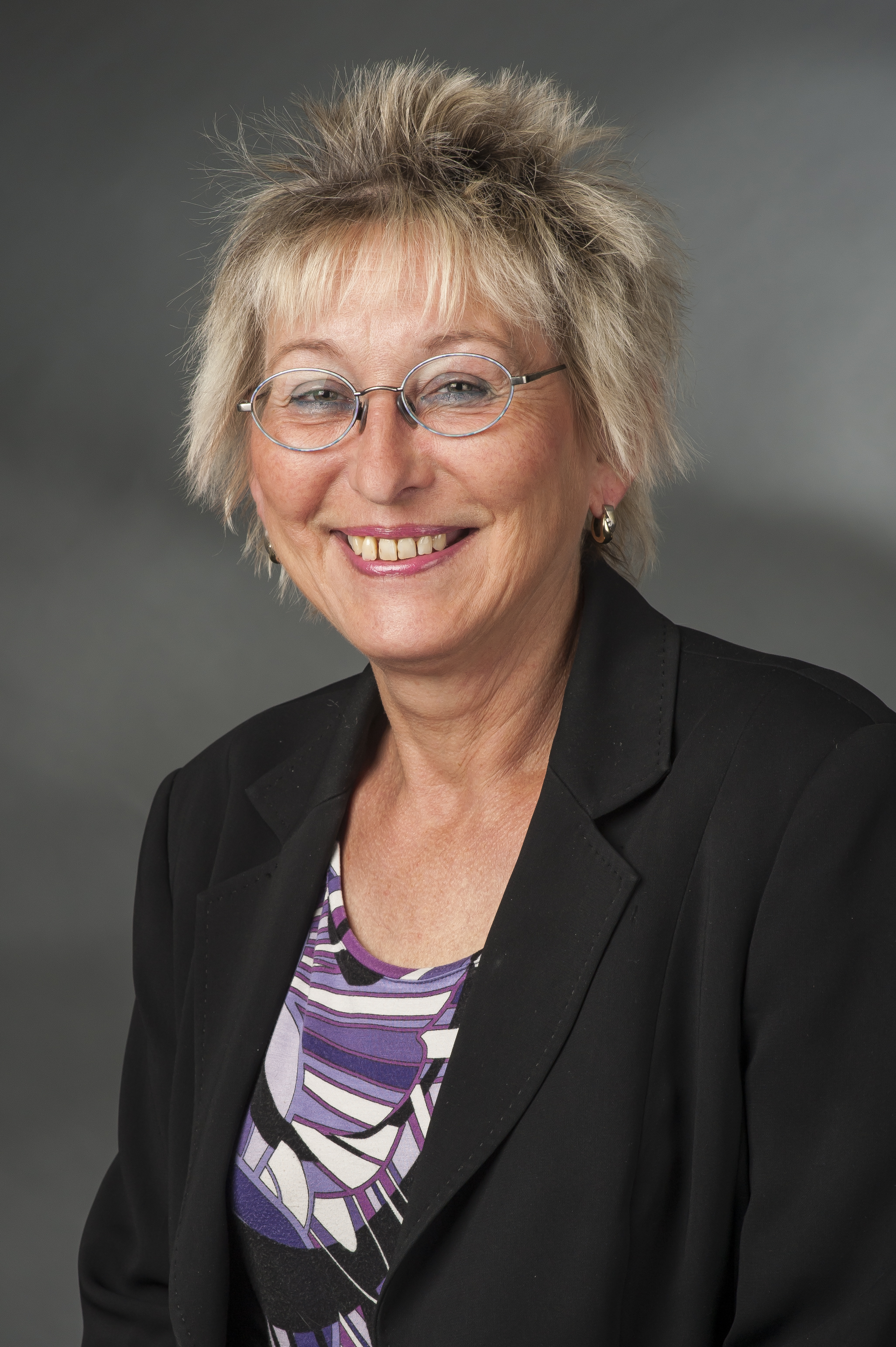
Eva Bulling-Schröter

Eva Maria Bulling-Schröter (born 22 February 1956) is a German politician and member of German Left party.

Bulling-Schröter was born in Ingolstadt, Bavaria. After attending Gymnasium from 1966 to 1974, she did a training as a locksmith from 1979 to 1981. She had been a Member of the DKP since 1974 before she joined the PDS in 1990 which merged into Die Linke in 2007. Since 2000, she is a spokesperson of her party in Bavaria.

Bulling-Schröter was a member of the Bundestag from 1994 to 2002 and again from 2005 to 2017. "The only true worker in the Bundestag", she continued working after she was a member.
