= Bergheim, Bavaria =

Bergheim
- Municipality
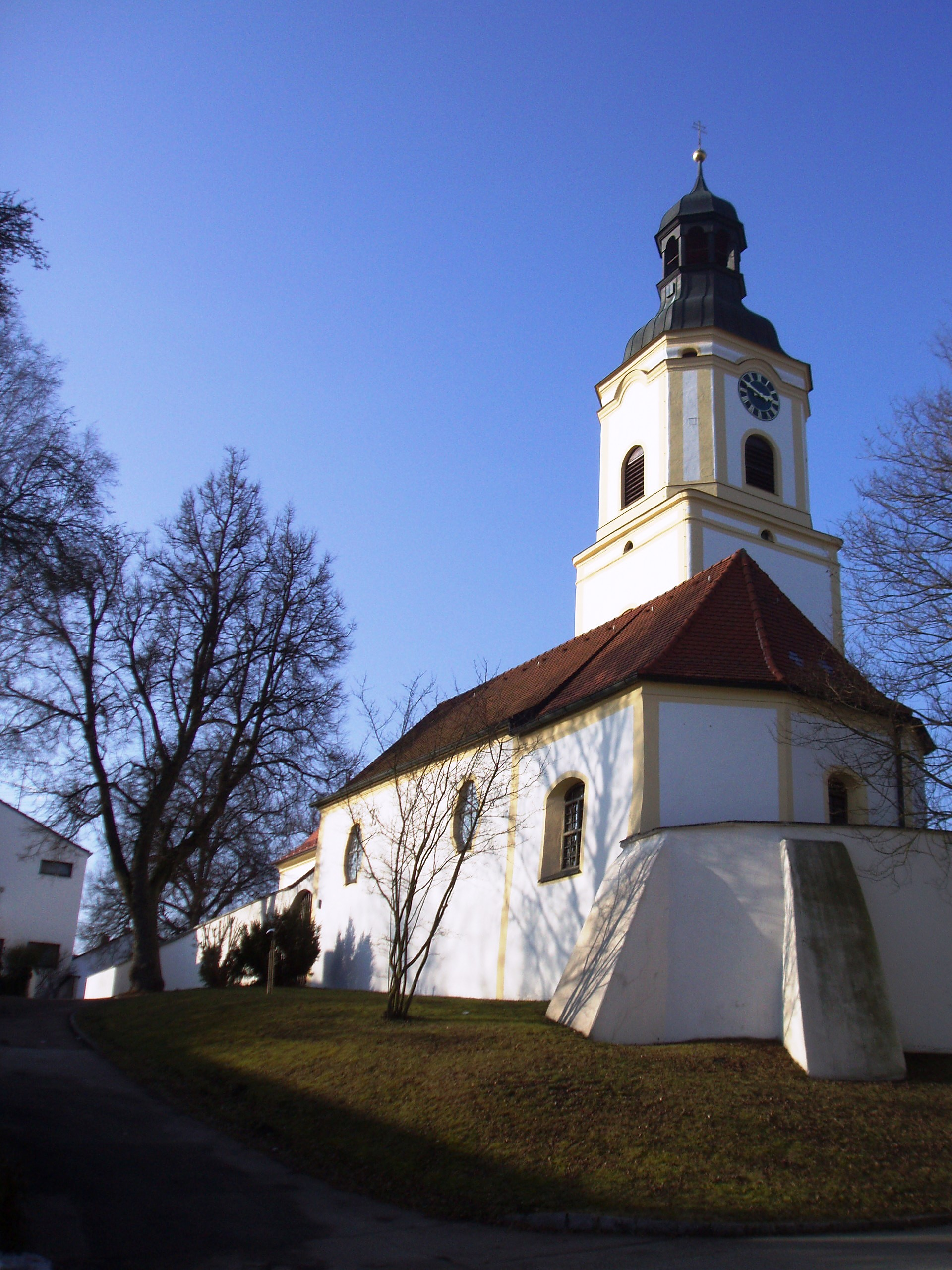
- Church in Bergheim

- Coat of arms

- Location of Bergheim within Neuburg-Schrobenhausen district
- Interactive map of Bergheim
- Location within Germany Location within Bavaria
- Coordinates: 48°46′N 11°16′E
- Country: Germany
- State: Bavaria
- Admin. region: Oberbayern
- District: Neuburg-Schrobenhausen
- Municipal assoc.: Neuburg an der Donau
- Subdivisions: 3 Ortsteile

Government
  - Mayor (2020–26): Tobias Gensberger

Area
  - Total: 28.92 km^{2} (11.17 sq mi)
- Elevation: 389 m (1,276 ft)

Population (2025-12-31)
  - Total: 2,029
  - Density: 70.16/km^{2} (181.7/sq mi)
- Time zone: UTC+01:00 (CET)
  - Summer (DST): UTC+02:00 (CEST)
- Postal codes: 86673
- Dialling codes: 08431
- Vehicle registration: ND
- Website: www.gemeinde-bergheim.de

Bergheim (German pronunciation: [ˈbɛʁkhaɪm]) is a municipality in the Neuburg-Schrobenhausen district of the state of Bavaria in Germany.

== Divisions ==
The municipality has 3 divisions.

== History ==
The municipality was created on May 1, 1978, from the municipalities Bergheim, Unterstall and Attenfeld.

== Similar places ==
There is a municipality in the same district named Burgheim. There is also a former municipality named Bergheim that is now part of the city of Augsburg.
