= Karlskron =

- Municipality
- Coat of arms

- Location of Karlskron within Neuburg-Schrobenhausen district
- Interactive map of Karlskron
- Location within Germany Location within Bavaria
- Coordinates: 48°40′N 11°25′E
- Country: Germany
- State: Bavaria
- Admin. region: Oberbayern
- District: Neuburg-Schrobenhausen
- Subdivisions: 13 Ortsteile

Government
  - Mayor (2020–26): Stefan Kumpf (CSU)

Area
  - Total: 38.45 km^{2} (14.85 sq mi)
- Elevation: 370 m (1,210 ft)

Population (2025-12-31)
  - Total: 5,159
  - Density: 134.2/km^{2} (347.5/sq mi)
- Time zone: UTC+01:00 (CET)
  - Summer (DST): UTC+02:00 (CEST)
- Postal codes: 85123
- Dialling codes: 08450, 08453
- Vehicle registration: ND

Karlskron is a municipality in the district of Neuburg-Schrobenhausen in Bavaria in Germany.

It is located within the Old Bavarian Donaumoos.
