= Rennertshofen =

- Municipality
- Coat of arms

- Location of Rennertshofen within Neuburg-Schrobenhausen district
- Interactive map of Rennertshofen
- Location within Germany Location within Bavaria
- Coordinates: 48°45′N 11°2′E
- Country: Germany
- State: Bavaria
- Admin. region: Oberbayern
- District: Neuburg-Schrobenhausen

Government
  - Mayor (2020–26): Georg Hirschbeck

Area
  - Total: 93.07 km^{2} (35.93 sq mi)
- Elevation: 394 m (1,293 ft)

Population (2025-12-31)
  - Total: 4,835
  - Density: 51.95/km^{2} (134.6/sq mi)
- Time zone: UTC+01:00 (CET)
  - Summer (DST): UTC+02:00 (CEST)
- Postal codes: 86643
- Dialling codes: 08434
- Vehicle registration: ND
- Website: www.rennertshofen.de

Rennertshofen is a municipality in the district of Neuburg-Schrobenhausen in Bavaria in Germany. It consists of the following 28 Ortsteile: Altstetten, Ammerfeld, Antoniberg, Asbrunn, Bertoldsheim, Dittenfeld, Dünsberg, Ellenbrunn, Emskeim, Erlbach, Feldmühle, Gallenmühle, Giglberg, Hatzenhofen, Hundertthalermühle, Hütting, Kienberg, Mauern, Rennertshofen, Riedensheim, Rohrbach, Siglohe, Sprößlmühle, Stepperg, Störzelmühle, Treidelheim, Trugenhofen and Wolpertsau.
