= Rohrenfels =

- Municipality
- Coat of arms

- Location of Rohrenfels within Neuburg-Schrobenhausen district
- Interactive map of Rohrenfels
- Location within Germany Location within Bavaria
- Coordinates: 48°41′N 11°10′E
- Country: Germany
- State: Bavaria
- Admin. region: Oberbayern
- District: Neuburg-Schrobenhausen
- Municipal assoc.: Neuburg an der Donau

Government
  - Mayor (2020–26): Manuela Heckl

Area
  - Total: 17.53 km^{2} (6.77 sq mi)
- Elevation: 390 m (1,280 ft)

Population (2025-12-31)
  - Total: 1,636
  - Density: 93.33/km^{2} (241.7/sq mi)
- Time zone: UTC+01:00 (CET)
  - Summer (DST): UTC+02:00 (CEST)
- Postal codes: 86701
- Dialling codes: 08431
- Vehicle registration: ND
- Website: www.rohrenfels.de

Rohrenfels (German pronunciation: [ˈʁoːʁənfɛls]) is a municipality in the district of Neuburg-Schrobenhausen in Bavaria in Germany.
