= Karlshuld =

- Municipality
- Coat of arms

- Location of Karlshuld within Neuburg-Schrobenhausen district
- Interactive map of Karlshuld
- Location within Germany Location within Bavaria
- Coordinates: 48°41′N 11°18′E
- Country: Germany
- State: Bavaria
- Admin. region: Oberbayern
- District: Neuburg-Schrobenhausen
- Subdivisions: 6 Gemeindeteile

Government
  - Mayor (2020–26): Michael Lederer (FW)

Area
  - Total: 29.09 km^{2} (11.23 sq mi)
- Elevation: 375 m (1,230 ft)

Population (2025-12-31)
  - Total: 5,972
  - Density: 205.3/km^{2} (531.7/sq mi)
- Time zone: UTC+01:00 (CET)
  - Summer (DST): UTC+02:00 (CEST)
- Postal codes: 86668
- Dialling codes: 08454
- Vehicle registration: ND
- Website: www.karlshuld.de

Karlshuld (German pronunciation: [kaʁlsˈhʊlt]) is a municipality in the district of Neuburg-Schrobenhausen in Bavaria in Germany.

== History ==
The locality was created in the course of the draining of the Donaumooses begun at 1790, in the year 1795 it became a colony of Karl Freiherr v. Eckart and was named after Charles Theodore, Elector of Bavaria. The place was until 1840 seat of an aristocracy yard Mark (and/or a Patrimonialgerichts). 1804 had five times more than originally planned, already over 300 inhabitants. The living conditions were in particular in the beginning, very hard, and improved in the course of the decades only little. 1824 were created a little later again a closed spinning mill, 1898 developed the moorland laboratory. 1888 gave it already 1,227 inhabitants. The place kept courses of a distressed area, until the Second World War when, like in many places, a fundamental upswing began.

As of the end of 2026, Karlshuld won in the last years also as residence - not least due to the proximity to Ingolstadt - at attractiveness.

In the years 1970 to 1985 took place the incorporations of the municipality parts Grasheim, Kochheim, Nazibühl and Neuschwetzingen.
