= Königsmoos =

- Municipality
- Coat of arms

- Location of Königsmoos within Neuburg-Schrobenhausen district
- Interactive map of Königsmoos
- Location within Germany Location within Bavaria
- Coordinates: 48°40′N 11°13′E
- Country: Germany
- State: Bavaria
- Admin. region: Oberbayern
- District: Neuburg-Schrobenhausen

Government
  - Mayor (2020–26): Heinrich Seißler

Area
  - Total: 40.83 km^{2} (15.76 sq mi)
- Elevation: 377–392 m (1,237–1,286 ft)

Population (2025-12-31)
  - Total: 4,931
  - Density: 120.8/km^{2} (312.8/sq mi)
- Time zone: UTC+01:00 (CET)
  - Summer (DST): UTC+02:00 (CEST)
- Postal codes: 86669
- Dialling codes: 08433
- Vehicle registration: ND
- Website: www.koenigsmoos.de

Königsmoos (German pronunciation: [ˈkøːnɪçsˌmoːs]) is a municipality in the district of Neuburg-Schrobenhausen in Bavaria in Germany.

It is located within the Old Bavarian Donaumoos.
