= Neuburg-Schrobenhausen =

Coordinates: 48°40′N 11°10′E

- District
- Flag Coat of arms
- Country: Germany
- State: Bavaria
- Adm. region: Upper Bavaria
- Capital: Neuburg an der Donau

Government
  - District admin.: Peter von der Grün (FW)

Area
  - Total: 740 km^{2} (290 sq mi)

Population (31 December 2025)
  - Total: 99,429
  - Density: 130/km^{2} (350/sq mi)
- Time zone: UTC+01:00 (CET)
  - Summer (DST): UTC+02:00 (CEST)
- Vehicle registration: ND, SOB
- Website: neuburg-schrobenhausen.de

Neuburg-Schrobenhausen is a Landkreis (district) in Bavaria, Germany. It is bounded by (from the east and clockwise) the districts of Pfaffenhofen, Aichach-Friedberg, Donau-Ries and Eichstätt, and by the city of Ingolstadt.

== History ==
The district was established in 1972 by merging the former districts of Neuburg and Schrobenhausen.

== Geography ==
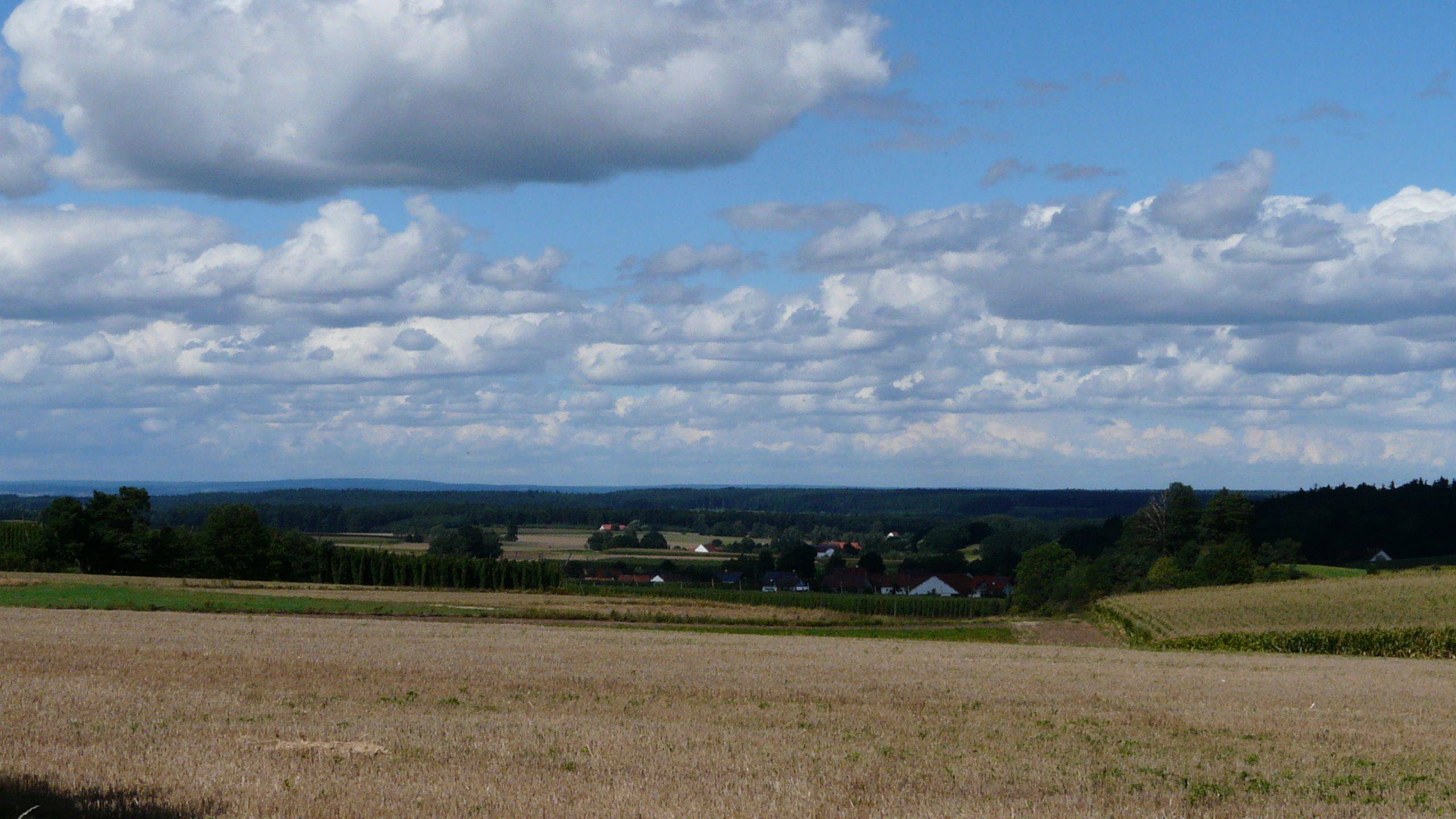
Aresing, ND - Oberlauterbach östl - Paartal 01

The district consists of the previously swampy areas between the Danube and Paar rivers, that are called the Donaumoos. North of the Danube the district includes a small part of the Altmühl Valley Nature Park.

== Coat of arms ==
The coat of arms displays:

- the bear's head from the city arms of Schrobenhausen
- the heraldic lion of the Electorate of the Palatinate
- a wavy line symbolising the Danube River

== Towns and municipalities ==
Clickable map of towns and municipalities in the district

Towns
1. Neuburg an der Donau
2. Schrobenhausen
Märkte
1. Burgheim
2. Rennertshofen
Municipalities
1. Aresing
2. Ehekirchen
3. Karlshuld
4. Karlskron
5. Königsmoos
6. Oberhausen
7. Weichering

Verwaltungsgemeinschaften

1. Neuburg an der Donau

1. Bergheim
2. Rohrenfels

2. Schrobenhausen

1. Berg im Gau
2. Brunnen
3. Gachenbach
4. Langenmosen
5. Waidhofen
