= Burgheim =

- Municipality
- Coat of arms

- Location of Burgheim within Neuburg-Schrobenhausen district
- Interactive map of Burgheim
- Location within Germany Location within Bavaria
- Coordinates: 48°42′N 11°1′E
- Country: Germany
- State: Bavaria
- Admin. region: Oberbayern
- District: Neuburg-Schrobenhausen
- Subdivisions: 12 Ortsteile

Government
  - Mayor (2020–26): Michael Böhm

Area
  - Total: 49.73 km^{2} (19.20 sq mi)
- Elevation: 404 m (1,325 ft)

Population (2025-12-31)
  - Total: 4,656
  - Density: 93.63/km^{2} (242.5/sq mi)
- Time zone: UTC+01:00 (CET)
  - Summer (DST): UTC+02:00 (CEST)
- Postal codes: 86666
- Dialling codes: 08432
- Vehicle registration: ND
- Website: www.burgheim.de

Burgheim (German pronunciation: [ˈbʊʁkhaɪm]) is a municipality in the Neuburg-Schrobenhausen district in the state of Bavaria in Germany. It is a market town.

== Divisions ==
The municipality contains:

- Burgheim
- Biding
- Dezenacker
- Eschling
- Illdorf
- Kunding
- Leidling
- Längloh
- Moos
- Ortlfing
- Straß
- Wengen

== Note ==
There is a municipality in the same district named Bergheim.
