= Ehekirchen =

- Municipality
- Coat of arms

- Location of Ehekirchen within Neuburg-Schrobenhausen district
- Interactive map of Ehekirchen
- Location within Germany Location within Bavaria
- Coordinates: 48°38′N 11°6′E
- Country: Germany
- State: Bavaria
- Admin. region: Oberbayern
- District: Neuburg-Schrobenhausen

Government
  - Mayor (2020–26): Günter Gamisch (FW)

Area
  - Total: 62.77 km^{2} (24.24 sq mi)
- Elevation: 380–507 m (1,247–1,663 ft)

Population (2025-12-31)
  - Total: 3,674
  - Density: 58.53/km^{2} (151.6/sq mi)
- Time zone: UTC+01:00 (CET)
  - Summer (DST): UTC+02:00 (CEST)
- Postal codes: 86676
- Dialling codes: 08435
- Vehicle registration: ND
- Website: www.ehekirchen.de

Ehekirchen (German pronunciation: [eːəˈkɪʁçn̩]) is a municipality in the district of Neuburg-Schrobenhausen in Bavaria, Germany.
