= Neuburg an der Donau =

- Town
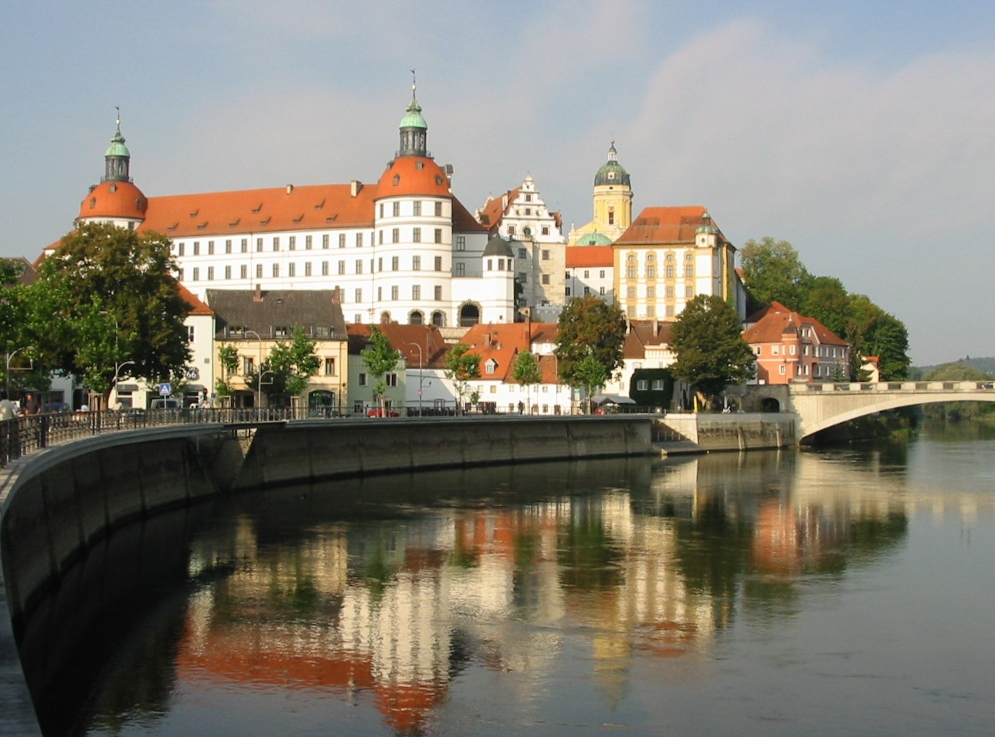
- Residenzschloss, the seat of Palatine Electors

- Coat of arms

- Location of Neuburg an der Donau within Neuburg-Schrobenhausen district
- Interactive map of Neuburg an der Donau
- Location within Germany Location within Bavaria
- Coordinates: 48°44′N 11°11′E
- Country: Germany
- State: Bavaria
- Admin. region: Oberbayern
- District: Neuburg-Schrobenhausen
- Subdivisions: 16 Ortsteile

Government
  - Mayor (2026–32): Gerhard Schoder (B90/Die Grünen)

Area
  - Total: 81.29 km^{2} (31.39 sq mi)
- Elevation: 383 m (1,257 ft)

Population (2025-12-31)
  - Total: 30,039
  - Density: 369.5/km^{2} (957.1/sq mi)
- Time zone: UTC+01:00 (CET)
  - Summer (DST): UTC+02:00 (CEST)
- Postal codes: 86633
- Dialling codes: 08431
- Vehicle registration: ND
- Website: www.neuburg-donau.de

Neuburg an der Donau (German pronunciation: [ˈnɔʏbʊʁk ʔan deːɐ̯ ˈdoːnaʊ], lit. 'Neuburg on the Danube'; Central Bavarian: Neiburg an da Donau) is a town which is the capital of the Neuburg-Schrobenhausen district in the state of Bavaria in Germany that is over 1,200 years old.

== Divisions ==
The municipality has 16 divisions:

- Altmannstetten
- Bergen, Neuburg
- Bittenbrunn
- Bruck
- Feldkirchen
- Gietlhausen
- Hardt
- Heinrichsheim
- Herrenwörth
- Hessellohe
- Joshofen
- Marienheim
- Maxweiler
- Laisacker
- Sehensand
- Zell

== History ==
Neuburg has been inhabited since the Bronze Age with artifacts discovered on the hill where the modern palace is located.

A Roman settlement was also located on the high hill overlooking the Danube, providing a part of the Limes, the border between the Empire and its Germanic enemies.

The massive Neuburg Castle was built during the early Middle Ages by the Aiglolfings, at the site of the old Roman fortress. In 1527 the Wittelsbach Family re-designed the castle into a Renaissance palace, which is what we see today.

Neuburg was part of an episcopal see. In the 10th century it passed to the counts of Scheyern and through them to Bavaria, being ceded to the Rhenish Palatinate at the close of a war in 1507. From 1557 to 1742 it was the capital of a small principality ruled by a cadet branch of the family of the elector palatine of the Rhine. This principality of Palatinate-Neuburg had an area of about 2,600 square kilometres (1,000 sq mi) and about 100,000 inhabitants.

During the Thirty Years' War, the city was conquered and occupied several times between 1632 and 1634 during the battles for Regensburg by Swedish troops passing through here, while crossing the Danube.

In 1742 it was united again with the Rhenish Palatinate, with which it passed in 1777 to Bavaria.

In 1800, in the course of the War of the Second Coalition, the French army achieved a victory over the Austrian troops at the Battle of Neuburg.

In 1806 in became part of firstly Altmühlkreis (its center was Eichstätt) between 1806 and 1808, later Oberdonaukreis (its center was firstly Eichstätt between 1810 and 1817, later Augsburg between 1817 and 1837). It was a rural district center in Schwaben region in 29 November 1837. On 30 June 1972, Neuburg an der Donau became a Grosse Kreisstadt (similar to a county seat) and was passed to Upper Bavaria region.

During the World War II, Neuburg was bombed by the Allies in April 1943. By late April 1945 the US Army liberated the town from the Nazis.

== Main sights ==
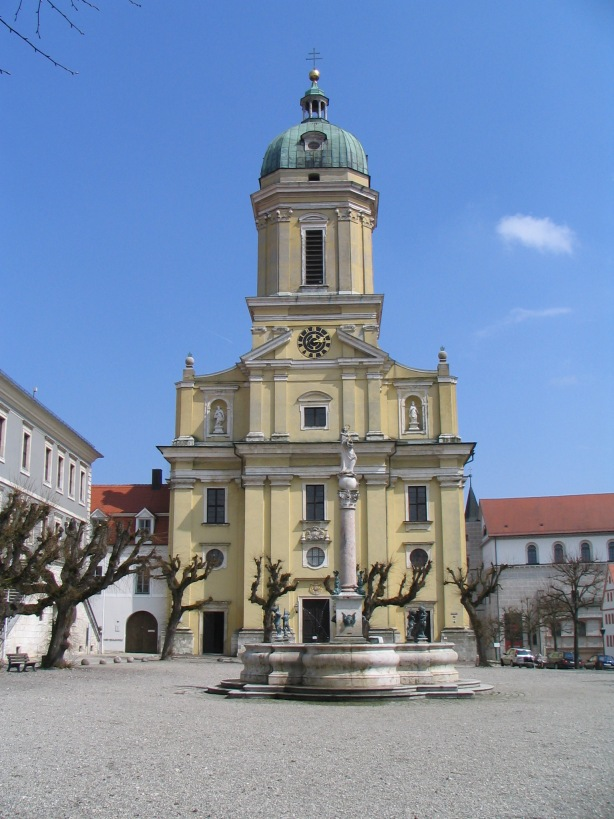
Hofkirche

Neuburg an der Donau has a defensive wall around the old town.

The Renaissance Ducal Palace (Pfalz-Neuburger Residenzschloss), Neuburg Castle, which was built 1530-45 under Otto Henry, Elector Palatine and took on its present-day form during the reign of Philip William, Elector Palatine, today houses several museums including a Baroque gallery of the Bavarian State Picture Collection and the Archäologie-Museum Schloss Neuburg an der Donau (Neuburg an der Donau Castle Archaeology Museum), a branch of the Bavarian State Archaeological Collection.

Other main sights include the late Renaissance court church Hofkirche (1607/08 built by Josef Heintz), the Town Hall (1603/09), the rococo Provinzialbibliothek (Provincial Library, 1731/32) and the baroque churches of St. Peter (1641/46) and St. Ursula (1700/01). Grünau is a renaissance hunting lodge of Elector Otto Henry, which is situated 7 km further east (built from 1530 onwards).

== Transport ==
The nearest international airport to the town is Munich Airport, located 82 km (51 mi) of Neuburg an der Donau.

== Twin towns – sister cities ==
Neuburg an der Donau is twinned with:

- Sète, France
- Jeseník, Czech Republic
- Velká Kraš, Czech Republic
- Vidnava, Czech Republic

Neuburg an der Donau also is a part of the Newcastle Alliance (cities named "New Castle") along with:

- Neuchâtel, Switzerland
- Neufchâteau, Vosges, France
- New Castle, Delaware, United States
- New Castle, Indiana, United States
- New Castle, Pennsylvania, United States
- Newcastle-under-Lyme, England
- Newcastle upon Tyne, England
- Newcastle, KwaZulu-Natal, South Africa
- Shinshiro, Japan

== Notable people ==
- Philip William, Elector Palatine (1615–1690), Count Palatine of Neuburg, 1653 to 1690
- Francis Louis of Palatinate-Neuburg (1664–1732), Prince-Bishop of Breslau (Wrocław)
- Eduard von Lutz (1810–1893), Bavarian Major General and War Minister
- Heinrich Schlier (1900–1978), theologian, initially with the Evangelical Church and later with the Catholic Church
- Günter Hirsch (born 1943), jurist, President of the Federal Supreme Court 2000–2008
- Bernd Eichinger (1949–2011), film producer, director and screenwriter
- Hans-Peter Ferner (born 1956), middle distance runner
- Doris Schröder-Köpf (born 1963), journalist and author
- Diana Kobzanová (born 1982), a Czech TV host and beauty pageant titleholder, Miss Czech Republic 2001
- Verena Rehm (born 1984), singer, pianist and songwriter
