= Freising (electoral district) =

Federal electoral district of Germany

213 Freising
- Electoral district for the Bundestag
- Freising in 2025
- State: Bavaria
- Population: 337,800 (2019)
- Electorate: 238,346 (2025)
- Major settlements: Freising; Pfaffenhofen an der Ilm; Moosburg an der Isar
- Area: 1,802.2 km^{2}

Current electoral district
- Created: 1976
- Party: CSU
- Member: Christian Moser
- Elected: 2025

Freising is an electoral constituency (German: Wahlkreis) represented in the Bundestag. It elects one member via first-past-the-post voting. Under the current constituency numbering system, it is designated as constituency 213. It is located in southern Bavaria, comprising the districts of Freising, Pfaffenhofen, the southern part of the Neuburg-Schrobenhausen district.

Freising was created for the 1976 federal election. Since 2025, it has been represented by Christian Moser of the Christian Social Union (CSU).

== Geography ==
Freising is located in southern Bavaria. As of the 2021 federal election, it comprises the districts of Freising and Pfaffenhofen as well as the municipalities of Aresing, Berg im Gau, Brunnen, Gachenbach, Langenmosen, Schrobenhausen, and Waidhofen from the district of Neuburg-Schrobenhausen.

== History ==
Freising was created in 1976. In the 1976 election, it was constituency 201 in the numbering system. In the 1980 through 1998 elections, it was number 200. In the 2002 and 2005 elections, it was number 216. In the 2009 and 2013 elections, it was number 215. In the 2017 and 2021 elections, it was number 214. From the 2025 election, it has been number 213.

Originally, the constituency comprised the districts of Freising and Pfaffenhofen and the municipalities of Aschheim, Dornach, Feldkirchen, Garching bei München, Grasbrunn, Haar, Harthausen, Heimstetten, Hohenbrunn, Ismaning, Kirchheim bei München, Oberschleißheim, Putzbrunn, Unterföhring, and Unterschleißheim from the Landkreis München district. In the 1980 through 1994 elections, it comprised the districts of Freising, Pfaffenhofen, and Erding. In the 1998 election, it comprised the districts of Freising and Pfaffenhofen and, from the Erding district, the municipalities of Bockhorn, Dorfen, Erding, Fraunberg, Isen, Lengdorf, Sankt Wolfgang, and Taufkirchen and the Verwaltungsgemeinschaften of Steinkirchen and Wartenberg. In the 2002 election, it lost the municipalities of Isen, Lengdorf, Sankt Wolfgang from the Erding district. In the 2005 and 2009 elections, it comprised only the districts of Freising and Pfaffenhofen. In the 2013 election, it gained the municipality of Petershausen from the Dachau district and the municipality of Aresing from the Neuburg-Schrobenhausen district. It acquired its current borders in the 2017 election.

Election	No.	Name	Borders
1976	201	Freising	Freising district; Pfaffenhofen district; Landkreis München district (only Aschheim, Dornach, Feldkirchen, Garching bei München, Grasbrunn, Haar, Harthausen, Heimstetten, Hohenbrunn, Ismaning, Kirchheim bei München, Oberschleißheim, Putzbrunn, Unterföhring, and Unterschleißheim municipalities)
1980	200	Freising	Freising district; Pfaffenhofen district; Erding district
1983	200	Freising	Freising district; Pfaffenhofen district; Erding district
1987	200	Freising	Freising district; Pfaffenhofen district; Erding district
1990	200	Freising	Freising district; Pfaffenhofen district; Erding district
1994	200	Freising	Freising district; Pfaffenhofen district; Erding district
1998	200	Freising	Freising district; Pfaffenhofen district; Erding district (only Bockhorn, Dorfen, Erding, Fraunberg, Isen, Lengdorf, Sankt Wolfgang, and Taufkirchen municipalities and Steinkirchen and Wartenberg Verwaltungsgemeinschaften)
2002	216	Freising	Freising district; Pfaffenhofen district; Erding district (only Bockhorn, Dorfen, Erding, Fraunberg, and Taufkirchen municipalities and Steinkirchen and Wartenberg Verwaltungsgemeinschaften)
2005	216	Freising	Freising district; Pfaffenhofen district
2009	215	Freising	Freising district; Pfaffenhofen district
2013	215	Freising	Freising district; Pfaffenhofen district; Dachau district (only Petershausen municipality); Neuburg-Schrobenhausen district (only Aresing municipality)
2017	214	Freising	Freising district; Pfaffenhofen district; Neuburg-Schrobenhausen district (only Aresing, Berg im Gau, Brunnen, Gachenbach, Langenmosen, Schrobenhausen, and Waidhofen municipalities)
2021	214	Freising	Freising district; Pfaffenhofen district; Neuburg-Schrobenhausen district (only Aresing, Berg im Gau, Brunnen, Gachenbach, Langenmosen, Schrobenhausen, and Waidhofen municipalities)
2025	213	Freising	Freising district; Pfaffenhofen district; Neuburg-Schrobenhausen district (only Aresing, Berg im Gau, Brunnen, Gachenbach, Langenmosen, Schrobenhausen, and Waidhofen municipalities)

== Members ==
The constituency has been held continuously by the Christian Social Union (CSU) since its creation. It was first represented by Albert Probst from 1976 to 1998. He was succeeded by Franz Obermeier from 1998 to 2013. Erich Irlstorfer represented the constituency from 2013 until 2025. Christian Moser retained the seat for the CSU in 2025.

Election	Member	Party	%
1976	Albert Probst	CSU	63.3
1980	Albert Probst	CSU	65.5
1983	Albert Probst	CSU	68.4
1987	Albert Probst	CSU	62.6
1990	Albert Probst	CSU	58.5
1994	Albert Probst	CSU	58.4
1998	Franz Obermeier	CSU	54.9
2002	Franz Obermeier	CSU	62.7
2005	Franz Obermeier	CSU	56.5
2009	Franz Obermeier	CSU	46.9
2013	Erich Irlstorfer	CSU	52.9
2017	Erich Irlstorfer	CSU	43.0
2021	Erich Irlstorfer	CSU	36.2
2025	Christian Moser	CSU	43.1

== Election results ==
=== 2025 election ===
Federal election (2025): Freising
Notes:	Blue background denotes the winner of the electorate vote. Pink background denotes a candidate elected from their party list. Yellow background denotes an electorate win by a list member, or other incumbent. A ✓ or ✗ denotes status of any incumbent, win or lose respectively.						
Party	Candidate	Votes	%	±%	Party votes	%	±%
CSU	Christian Moser	88,023	43.1	▲7.0	78,633	38.5	▲5.9
AfD	Claus Staudhammer	36,965	18.1	▲ +8.8	38,981	19.1	▲10.0
Greens	Leon Eckert	25,718	12.6	▲0.1	23,759	11.6	▼1.9
SPD	Andreas Mehltretter	23,357	11.4	▼2.0	20,234	9.9	▼5.2
Left	Sebastian Pisot	8,630	4.2	▲2.2	10,646	5.2	▲2.9
FW	Birgit Weinsteiger-Tauer	13,209	6.5	▼5.6	11,034	5.4	▼4.3
dieBasis	Michael Stangl	2,362	1.2	▼1.3	948	0.5	▼1.3
ÖDP				▼1.6	1,034	0.5	▼0.2
PARTEI				▼1.1	868	0.4	▼0.3
BP				▼0.9	367	0.2	▼0.4
Unabhängige				▼0.5			▼0.5
Volt				▼0.3	1,193	0.6	▲0.3
BSW					5,829	2.9	
Humanists					177	0.1	0.0
BD					135	0.1	
MLPD					37	0.0	0.0
Team Todenhöfer							▼0.4
Pirates							▼0.3
Verjüngungsforschung							▼0.1
Bündnis C							0.0
Informal votes		942			0.5		
Total valid votes		204,067			204,430		
Turnout		205,009	86.0	▲4.2			
CSU hold	Majority			▼6.8			

=== 2021 election ===
Federal election (2021): Freising
Notes:	Blue background denotes the winner of the electorate vote. Pink background denotes a candidate elected from their party list. Yellow background denotes an electorate win by a list member, or other incumbent. A ✓ or ✗ denotes status of any incumbent, win or lose respectively.						
Party	Candidate	Votes	%	±%	Party votes	%	±%
CSU	✓ Erich Irlstorfer	69,689	36.2	▼6.8	62,930	32.6	▼7.1
SPD	Andreas Mehltretter	25,950	13.5	0.0	29,085	15.1	▲2.7
Greens	Leon Eckert	24,058	12.5	▲3.1	26,055	13.5	▲3.8
FW	Karl Ecker	23,223	12.0	▲5.6	18,779	9.7	▲5.9
AfD	Johannes Huber	18,042	9.4	▼3.2	17,515	9.1	▼4.5
FDP	Eva-Maria Schmidt	14,687	7.6	▲0.4	21,738	11.3	▲0.9
dieBasis	Karl Reineke	4,795	2.5		3,388	1.8	
Left	Nicolas-Pano Graßy	3,898	2.0	▼3.0	4,456	2.3	▼2.8
Tierschutzpartei					1,881	1.0	0.0
ÖDP	Emilia Kirner	3,039	1.6	▼0.2	1,449	0.8	▼0.2
PARTEI	Daniel Weigelt	2,165	1.1		1,385	0.7	▼0.1
BP	Florian Geisenfelder	1,678	0.9	▼0.4	1,068	0.6	▼0.5
Team Todenhöfer					781	0.4	
Pirates					554	0.3	▼0.1
V-Partei3	Magdalena Lippa	910	0.5		296	0.2	0.0
Volt	Hans Boljahn	631	0.3		543	0.3	
Unabhängige					335	0.2	
Gesundheitsforschung					218	0.1	0.0
Humanists					185	0.1	
NPD					108	0.1	▼0.2
The III. Path					106	0.1	
du.					88	0.0	
Bündnis C					86	0.0	
LKR					51	0.0	
DKP					20	0.0	0.0
MLPD					19	0.0	0.0
Informal votes		1,237			883		
Total valid votes		192,765			193,119		
Turnout		194,002	81.8	▲2.6			
CSU hold	Majority	43,739	22.7	▼6.8			

=== 2017 election ===
Federal election (2017): Freising
Notes:	Blue background denotes the winner of the electorate vote. Pink background denotes a candidate elected from their party list. Yellow background denotes an electorate win by a list member, or other incumbent. A ✓ or ✗ denotes status of any incumbent, win or lose respectively.						
Party	Candidate	Votes	%	±%	Party votes	%	±%
CSU	✓ Erich Irlstorfer	79,545	43.0	▼11.1	73,650	39.7	▼12.1
SPD	Andreas Mehltretter	24,916	13.5	▼3.7	23,029	12.4	▼3.7
AfD	Johannes Huber	23,222	12.5	▲8.8	25,178	13.6	▲8.9
Greens	Kerstin Schnapp	17,439	9.4	▲1.9	18,036	9.7	▲0.7
FDP	Thomas Neudert	13,400	7.2	▲4.8	19,308	11.4	▲5.8
FW	Robert Weller	11,878	6.4	▲1.9	7,076	3.8	▲0.1
Left	Guido Hoyer	9,265	5.0	▲2.1	9,506	5.1	▲1.9
ÖDP	Reinhold Reck	3,250	1.8	▲0.2	1,805	1.0	▼0.2
BP	Robert Prado Diaz	2,262	1.2		2,017	1.1	▼0.2
Tierschutzpartei					1,792	1.0	▲0.2
PARTEI					1,467	0.8	
Pirates					768	0.4	▼1.6
NPD					485	0.3	▼0.5
DM					364	0.2	
V-Partei³					323	0.2	
DiB					319	0.2	
Gesundheitsforschung					221	0.1	
BGE					218	0.1	
MLPD					35	0.0	0.0
DKP					18	0.0	
BüSo					17	0.0	0.0
Informal votes		1,470			1,015		
Total valid votes		185,177			185,632		
Turnout		186,647	79.2	▲7.4			
CSU hold	Majority	54,629	29.5	▼5.8			

=== 2013 election ===
Federal election (2013): Freising
Notes:	Blue background denotes the winner of the electorate vote. Pink background denotes a candidate elected from their party list. Yellow background denotes an electorate win by a list member, or other incumbent. A ✓ or ✗ denotes status of any incumbent, win or lose respectively.						
Party	Candidate	Votes	%	±%	Party votes	%	±%
CSU	Erich Irlstorfer	81,729	52.9	▲5.9	78,924	51.0	▲6.3
SPD	Florian Simbeck	27,165	17.6	▲3.4	25,243	16.3	▲2.9
Greens	Michael Stanglmaier	18,169	11.8	▼5.2	14,390	9.3	▼3.1
FW	Hinrich Groeneveld	7,123	4.6		5,780	3.7	
AfD	Marie-Madeleine von Kienlin	5,855	3.8		7,424	4.8	
Left	Thomas Schwarz	4,440	2.9	▼2.7	5,030	3.2	▼2.2
FDP	Jens Barschdorf	3,854	2.5	▼10.8	7,248	4.7	▼10.0
Pirates	Sebastian Kanschat	3,539	2.3		3,157	2.0	▼0.4
BP					2,010	1.3	▲0.3
ÖDP	Reinhold Reck	2,568	1.7	▲1.6	1,913	1.2	0.0
NPD					1,181	0.8	▼0.4
Tierschutzpartei					1,154	0.7	▲0.1
REP					500	0.3	▼0.3
DIE FRAUEN					264	0.2	
DIE VIOLETTEN					187	0.1	▼0.1
Party of Reason					148	0.1	
PRO					123	0.1	
RRP					44	0.0	▼1.0
BüSo					29	0.0	0.0
MLPD					26	0.0	0.0
Informal votes		1,439			1,106		
Total valid votes		154,442			154,775		
Turnout		155,881	71.9	▼1.0			
CSU hold	Majority	54,564	35.3	▲5.6			

=== 2009 election ===
Federal election (2009): Freising
Notes:	Blue background denotes the winner of the electorate vote. Pink background denotes a candidate elected from their party list. Yellow background denotes an electorate win by a list member, or other incumbent. A ✓ or ✗ denotes status of any incumbent, win or lose respectively.						
Party	Candidate	Votes	%	±%	Party votes	%	±%
CSU	✓ Franz Obermeier	69,229	46.9	▼9.6	66,336	44.7	▼7.4
Greens	Michael Stanglmaier	25,408	17.2	▲9.4	18,400	12.4	▲4.2
SPD	Uwe Dörnhöfer	20,791	14.1	▼9.4	19,915	13.4	▼8.9
FDP	Franz Niedermayr	19,711	13.4	▲7.8	21,848	14.7	▲4.5
Left	Guido Hoyer	8,247	5.6	▲2.7	8,120	5.5	▲2.3
Pirates					3,583	2.4	
ÖDP					1,878	1.3	
NPD	Christian Götz	2,558	1.7	▲0.4	1,808	1.2	▲0.1
RRP	Peter Dörken	1,650	1.1		1,581	1.1	
BP					1,400	0.9	▲0.1
FAMILIE					1,021	0.7	0.0
Tierschutzpartei					988	0.7	
REP					900	0.6	▼0.2
DIE VIOLETTEN					327	0.2	
PBC					155	0.1	0.0
CM					119	0.1	
DVU					66	0.0	
BüSo					43	0.0	
MLPD					31	0.0	0.0
Informal votes		2,123			1,198		
Total valid votes		147,594			148,519		
Turnout		149,717	72.8	▼6.7			
CSU hold	Majority	43,821	29.7	▼3.4			

=== 2005 election ===
Federal election (2005): Freising
Notes:	Blue background denotes the winner of the electorate vote. Pink background denotes a candidate elected from their party list. Yellow background denotes an electorate win by a list member, or other incumbent. A ✓ or ✗ denotes status of any incumbent, win or lose respectively.						
Party	Candidate	Votes	%	±%	Party votes	%	±%
CSU	✓ Franz Obermeier	87,477	56.5	▼5.6	80,909	52.0	▼11.0
SPD	Sonja Gaul	36,283	23.4	▲0.3	34,693	22.3	▲0.3
Greens	Roland Dörfler	12,064	7.8	▲1.4	12,708	8.2	▲0.6
FDP	Ingo Stiefler	8,665	5.6	▼0.2	15,836	10.2	▲5.5
Left	Guido Hoyer	4,473	2.9	▲2.0	4,883	3.1	▲2.5
BP	Josef Schwaiger	3,665	2.4		1,331	0.9	▲0.1
NPD	Stefan Grebe	2,139	1.4		1,687	1.1	▲0.9
REP					1,255	0.8	▲0.3
Familie					1,019	0.7	
GRAUEN					459	0.3	▲0.2
Feminist					375	0.2	▲0.1
PBC					225	0.1	
BüSo					83	0.1	
MLPD					61	0.0	
Informal votes		2,279			1,521		
Total valid votes		154,766			155,524		
Turnout		157,045	79.5	▼3.5			
CSU hold	Majority	51,194	33.1				
