= Johann Michael Sailer =

German Jesuit theologian (1751–1832)

- Bishop of Regensburg
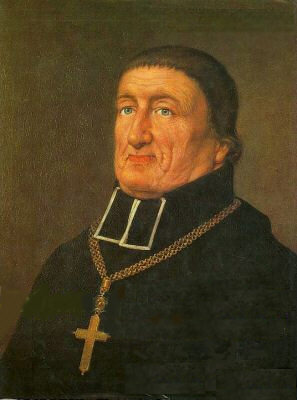
- Church: Catholic Church
- Diocese: Regensburg

Personal details
- Born: October 17, 1751 Aresing
- Died: 20 May 1832 (aged 80) Regensburg
- Coat of arms

Johann Michael Sailer (17 October 1751 – 20 May 1832) was a German Jesuit theologian and philosopher, and Bishop of Regensburg. Sailer was a major contributor to the Catholic Enlightenment.

== Biography ==
Sailer was born at Aresing in Upper Bavaria on 17 October 1751 as the son of a poor Catholic shoemaker and his wife. Until his tenth year, he attended the primary school in his native town. After this he was a pupil in the gymnasium at Munich. In 1770 he entered the Society of Jesus at Landsberg in Upper Bavaria as a novice; upon the suppression of the Society in 1773, he continued his theological and philosophical studies at Ingolstadt. In 1775 he was ordained priest; 1777-80 he was a tutor of philosophy and theology, and from 1780 second professor of dogmatics at Ingolstadt.

Along with many others, he lost his position in 1781 when the Elector Charles Theodore transferred theological instruction to the monasteries. In the years 1781-84, while engaged in literary work, Sailer attracted the attention of the elector and Bishop Clement Wenceslaus. In 1784 the latter called Sailer to Dillingen as professor of pastoral theology and ethics. Sailer held this position for ten years, earning a high reputation.

His opponents, professors of Dillingen and Rossle, the principal of the school at Pfaffenhausen, succeeded in limiting Sailer's activities in 1793 and in securing his sudden dismissal in 1794. Sailer went to visit his friend Winkelhofer at Munich. Pursued there by his opponents, he went to his friend Beck at Ebersberg. Here he devoted himself to literary work until he was called in 1799 to a professorship at Ingolstadt. In 1800 he was transferred along with the university to Landshut, where he taught pastoral and moral theology, pedagogics, homiletics, liturgy and catechetics.

Celebrated as a teacher and a writer, Sailer was repeatedly called to other positions, was on terms of friendship with distinguished Catholics and Protestants, and was universally revered by his pupils, among whom was the Crown Prince Louis, later King of Bavaria. In 1818 Sailer declined the offer of the Prussian Government to appoint him as Archbishop of Cologne; in 1819 the Bavarian Government, through the influence of the Crown Prince Louis, nominated him as Bishop of Augsburg, but the nomination was rejected by the Holy See. In 1821, however, after he had sufficiently justified himself, Sailer was appointed cathedral canon of Ratisbon, in 1822 as auxiliary bishop and coadjutor with right of succession, in 1825 as cathedral provost, and in 1829 as Bishop of Ratisbon.

As bishop he supported his choral vicar Karl Proske, in Proske's attempts to revive ancient church music.

Sailer lived in an era known as the "Enlightenment", which in its radical form disputed the fundamental dogmas of Christianity. It was characterized by contempt for Christian mysticism, a new worldliness of the clergy, relaxation of ecclesiastical discipline, denial of the primacy of papal jurisdiction, efforts of the State to gain control of the Church, turbulent reforms within the Church, and what many considered to be over-emphasis of intellect in education.

By contrast, Sailer defended fundamental principles of Christianity and traditional practice, striving for a faith to be expressed in charity, for the maintenance of godliness, and for the training of a pious and intelligent clergy. He also insisted that the pulpit should be reserved solely for the preaching of the Gospel, and that the bishops should be in union with the Pope. He upheld the primacy of the papacy and defended the freedom and rights of the Church against the encroachments of the State. He ardently desired ecclesiastical reform, not through unauthorized agencies but by the appointed organs of the Church; and he demanded that education should aim at training both mind and will.

Sailer labored for the Christian ideal by his winning personality, by his utterances as teacher, parish priest and preacher, and by his numerous written works. They were philosophical, theological, devotional and biographical in character. He died on 20 May 1832 in Regensburg.

Sailer attracted numerous people to Christianity and the Catholic Church. Notwithstanding his fruitful activity and his benevolence, Sailer had antagonists who opposed him partly from jealousy, partly from misunderstanding and ill-will; he was accused of heterodoxy, indifferentism and mysticism. If Sailer is judged in connection with his times, these reproaches are unfounded. In his day Sailer was a pillar of the Church. Goyau wrote about Sailer in his L'Allemagne religieuse (Paris, 1905):

"With Sailer German piety, both Protestant and Catholic, learned again to pray. This is the peculiar characteristic of his activity. Do not expect from him any religious polemics; he abhorred them; what he really cherished was the idea of a sort of cooperation of the various Christian bodies against the negations of infidelity. Sailer made a breach in Rationalism, by opposing to it a piety in which both Christian bodies could unite" (pp. 294, 295).

The best edition of his works is "J.M. Sailers samtliche Werke unter Anleitung des Verfassers", ed. Joseph Widmer, 40 volumes, Sulzbach, 1830–41; supplementary volume, 1845.

== Legacy ==
Johann-Michael-Sailer Gymnasium, a high school in Dillingen, is named after Sailer.

There is a monument to Johann Michael Sailer in Kardinal-von-Waldburg-Strasse, Dillingen and der Donau. It stands outside the Akademie für Lehrerfortbildung und Personalführung, the building in which Johann Michael Sailer was professor of pastoral theology and ethics from 1784 to 1794.
