= Hinterkaifeck murders =

Unsolved 1922 killings in Germany

Coordinates: 48°35′40″N 11°19′20″E

Hinterkaifeck
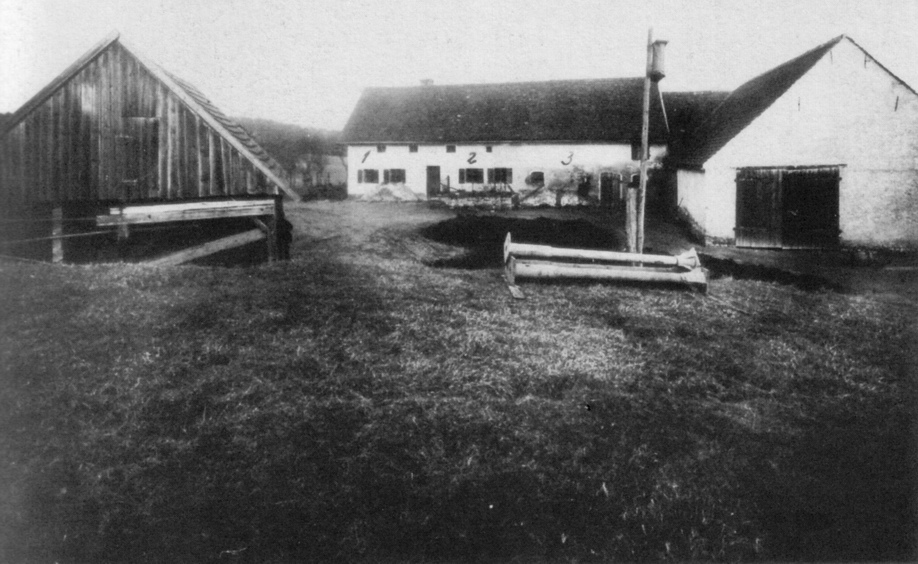
- Hinterkaifeck five days after the attack

- Hinterkaifeck murders (Bavaria) Hinterkaifeck murders (Germany)
- Location: Waidhofen, Bavaria, Germany
- Date: 31 March 1922
- Target: Gruber family
- Attack type: Home invasion, mass murder
- Weapon: Mattock
- Deaths: 6
- Perpetrator: Unknown
- Motive: Unknown

On the evening of 31 March 1922, six inhabitants of a small Bavarian farmstead, commonly referred to today as Hinterkaifeck ([ˈhɪntɐˌkaɪfɛk]), were murdered by an unknown assailant. Occurring approximately 70 kilometres (43 mi) north of Munich, the victims were Andreas Gruber (aged 63), his wife Cäzilia (aged 72), their widowed daughter Viktoria Gabriel (aged 35), Viktoria's children Cäzilia (aged 7) and Josef (aged 2) and their maid, Maria Baumgartner (aged 44). The murder weapon, a mattock, which was used on all six of the victims, was later recovered in the loft of the barn.

Immediately following the murders, the perpetrator lived with the six corpses for three days. During this time, he or she ate the food in the house, fed the animals on the property and used the fireplace. Four of the bodies were found stacked in the barn, the victims having likely been lured there one by one. Prior to the incident, other family members and a former maid had reported hearing strange noises coming from the attic, which led to said maid quitting the job. Considered one of the most gruesome and puzzling crimes in German history, the murders remain unsolved.

== Location ==
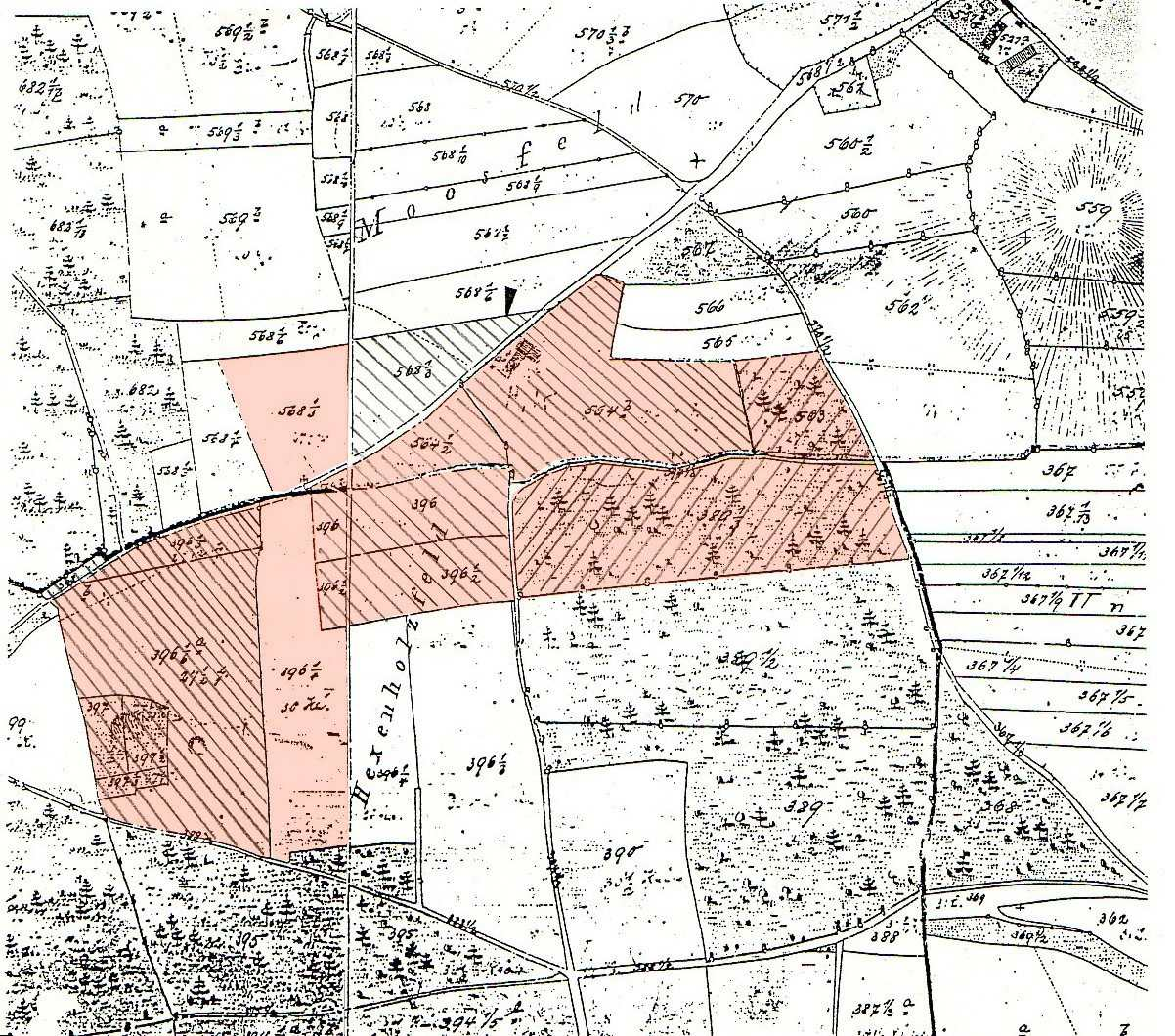
Map of the area in 1870

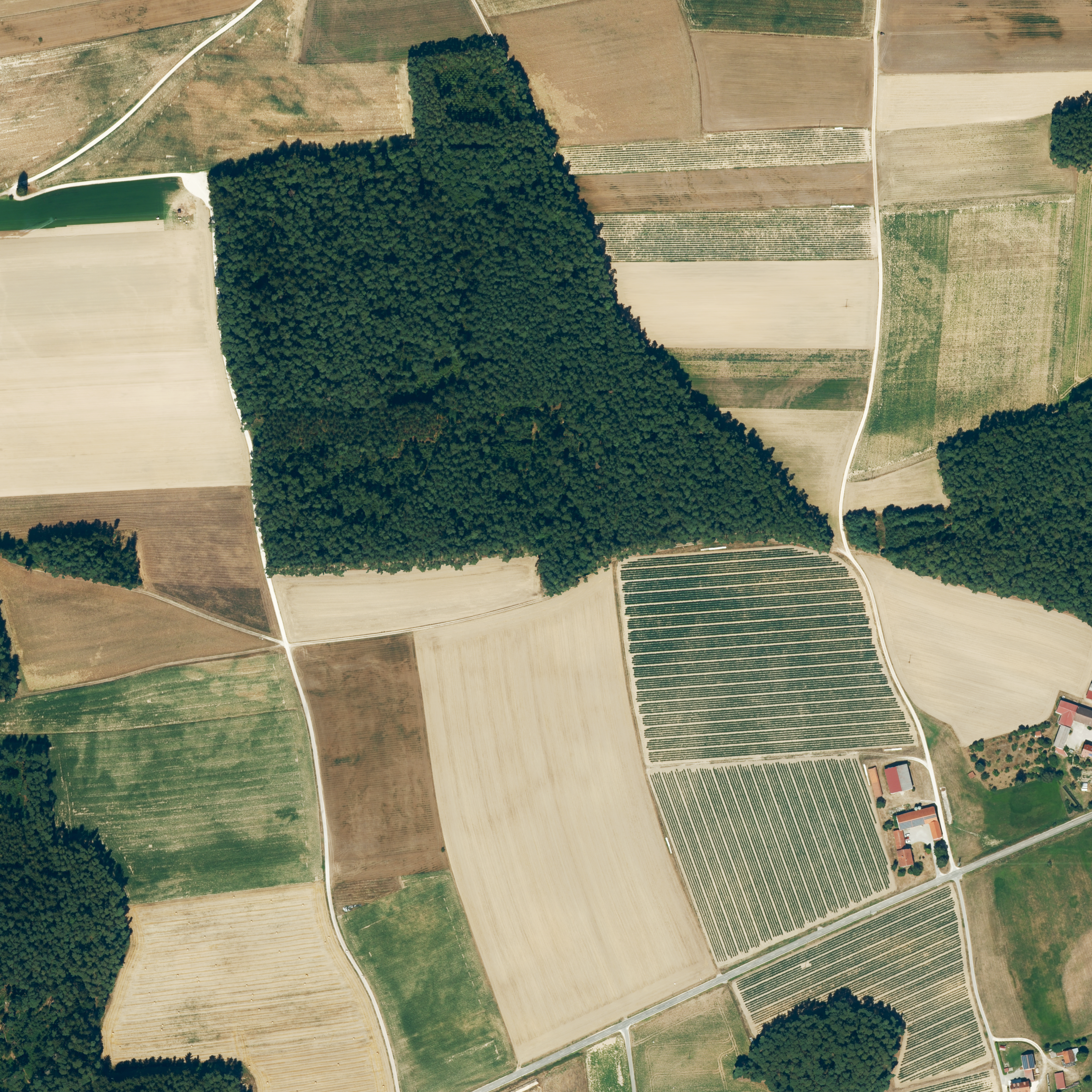
Aerial view of the area in the 2020s; the memorial is at upper left (northwest), with the site of the farmhouse being to the northeast of the memorial

The farm at Hinterkaifeck, approximately 70 kilometres (43 mi) north of Munich in the German province of Bavaria, was built around 1863. The name Hinterkaifeck comes from its location: Hinter meaning "behind" in German, and Kaifeck being a small nearby hamlet of that name. Per its German name, the Hinterkaifeck farmstead was essentially located behind Kaifeck or, more precisely, about one kilometre north of it and bordered by dense woods.

Less than a year after the murders, the farm was demolished to remove any reminder of the violence that had taken place there. During the demolition, additional evidence was revealed, including a mattock covered in dried blood hidden in the attic and a penknife in the hay in the barn. After the demolition, a small concrete monument known as the Hinterkaifeck Andachtsstätte was erected close to where the farm once stood, serving as a memorial to the victims.

== Background ==
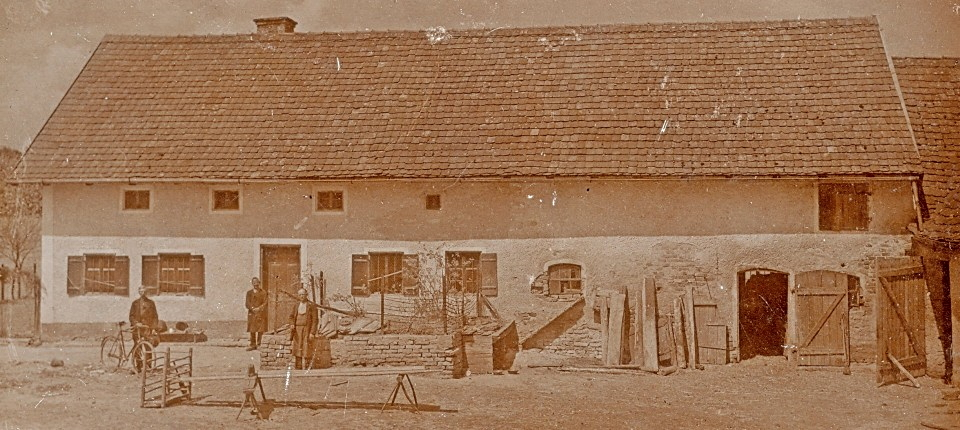
The farmhouse at Hinterkaifeck in 1912

Andreas Gruber was born on 9 November 1858 in the Bavarian locality of Grainstetten. He married Cäzilia Sanhüter (b. 27 November 1849 in Gerolsbach) in 1886 and subsequently moved to Hinterkaifeck, ownership of which had been given to Cäzilia in 1877 as part of a divorce settlement with her first husband, Josef Asam. Cäzilia's earlier marriage had produced three children: Martin (b. 1879), Cäzilia (b. 1881) and Andreas (c. 1883). Her marriage to the elder Andreas produced two more: Viktoria (b. 1887) and Sophie (b. 1889).

Viktoria married Karl Gabriel, a native of Waidhofen, on March 11, 1914; ownership of Hinterkaifeck was transferred to the couple by her parents on that date. Several months later, following the start of the First World War, Karl was called up into the military. He was reported killed at the Battle of Arras on December 12, 1914. The union had produced a sole daughter, Cäzilia Gabriel, born on 9 January 1915.

In 1915, Andreas Gruber (the elder) and Viktoria (his daughter) were convicted in Neuberg district court of having engaged in an incestuous relationship between 1907 and 1910. Andreas was sentenced to one year in prison while Viktoria served one month. In 1919, Andreas was again reported to authorities after Viktoria admitted to her lover, a neighbour named Lorenz Schlittenbauer, that her newborn son, Josef Gruber, had been conceived through her father's continuing sexual abuse. Schlittenbauer withdrew his complaint against Andreas shortly after his arrest, only to reassert his claims while giving sworn testimony at Andreas's trial. The court did not consider Schlittenbauer's testimony to be a sufficient basis for conviction and allowed Andreas to be released. However, due to several incriminating statements made by Andreas during his own testimony, he did not receive compensation for his pre-trial detention. Schlittenbauer agreed to adopt Josef as his own son.

== Murders ==
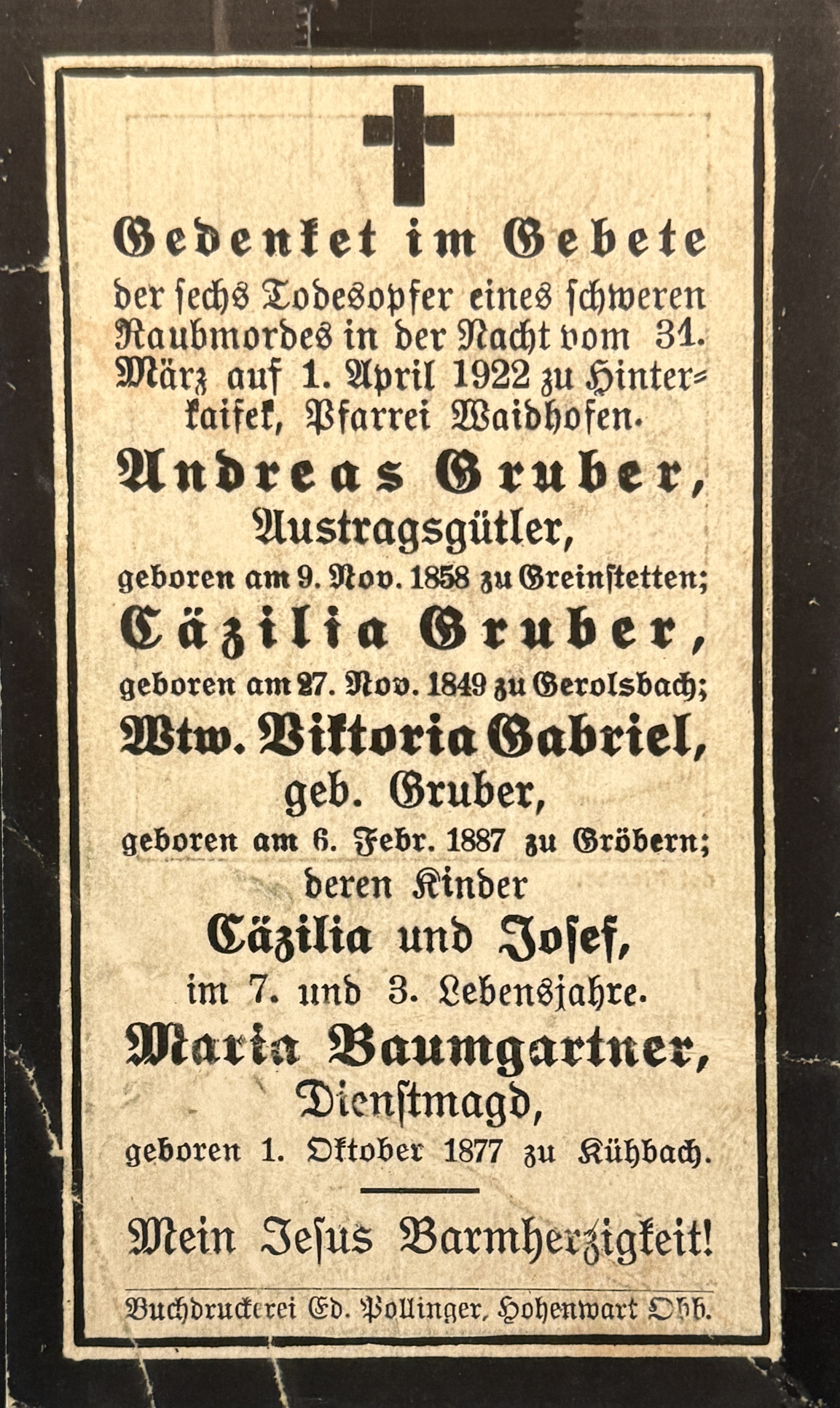
Memorial card requesting prayers be said for the victims.

=== Prelude ===
In the months prior to the killings, strange occurrences were reported in and around Hinterkaifeck. Kreszenz Rieger, the Gruber family's original maid, had quit about six months before the murders; it has been widely claimed that Rieger's reason for leaving was that she had heard strange noises in the attic, believing the house to be haunted. In March 1922, Andreas found a strange newspaper from Munich on the property that he could not remember purchasing, initially believing that the postman had lost the paper. This was not the case, however, as no one in the vicinity subscribed to the newspaper.

Just days before the murders, Andreas told neighbours he had discovered tracks in the fresh snow that led from the forest to a door with a broken lock that led to the farm's machine room. That same night, the Gruber family heard footsteps coming from the attic, but Andreas found no one upon conducting a search. Although he told several people about these alleged observations, he refused offers of help, and the incidents went unreported to police. According to a school friend of Viktoria's daughter Cäzilia Gabriel, the young girl reported that her mother had fled the farmstead the night before the murders after a violent argument with Andreas, and only hours later had been found in the forest.

=== 31 March to 1 April 1922 ===
On the afternoon of Friday 31 March 1922, the new maid, Maria Baumgartner, arrived at the farmstead. Maria's sister had escorted her there and left the farm after a short stay. She was most likely the last person to see the inhabitants alive. Maria had only worked at Hinterkaifeck for one day before the murders. Late that evening, Viktoria, her seven-year-old daughter Cäzilia Gabriel and her parents were lured to the barn through the stable, where they were murdered one after the other. The perpetrator(s) used a mattock belonging to the family and killed them with blows to the head. The perpetrator(s) then moved into the living quarters, where they used the same weapon to kill Josef—who was sleeping in his bassinet—and Maria in her bedchamber.

=== Discovery ===
Four days passed between the murders and the discovery of the bodies. On 1 April, coffee sellers Hans and Eduard Schirovsky arrived in Hinterkaifeck to take an order. When no one responded to their knocks on the door or window, they walked around the yard but found no one present. The Schirovskys noticed that the gate to the machine room was open but decided to leave. Cäzilia Gabriel was absent from school without excuse for a couple of days, and the Gruber family failed to appear for Sunday worship. On the morning of 4 April, local mechanic Albert Hofner visited Hinterkaifeck to repair an engine. After waiting for an hour without any sighting of the family, Hofner proceeded with his repair alone and left after roughly four and a half hours.

Later on 4 April, at around 3:30 p.m., Schlittenbauer sent his son Johann (16) and stepson Josef Dick (9) to Hinterkaifeck to see whether they could make contact with the family. When they reported that they had not seen anyone, Schlittenbauer himself visited the farmstead later that day with neighbours Michael Pöll and Jakob Sigl. Upon entering the barn, they found the bodies of Andreas, his wife Cäzilia, his daughter Viktoria and his granddaughter Cäzilia. Shortly afterwards, they found the bodies of Maria and Josef inside the living quarters.

== Investigation ==
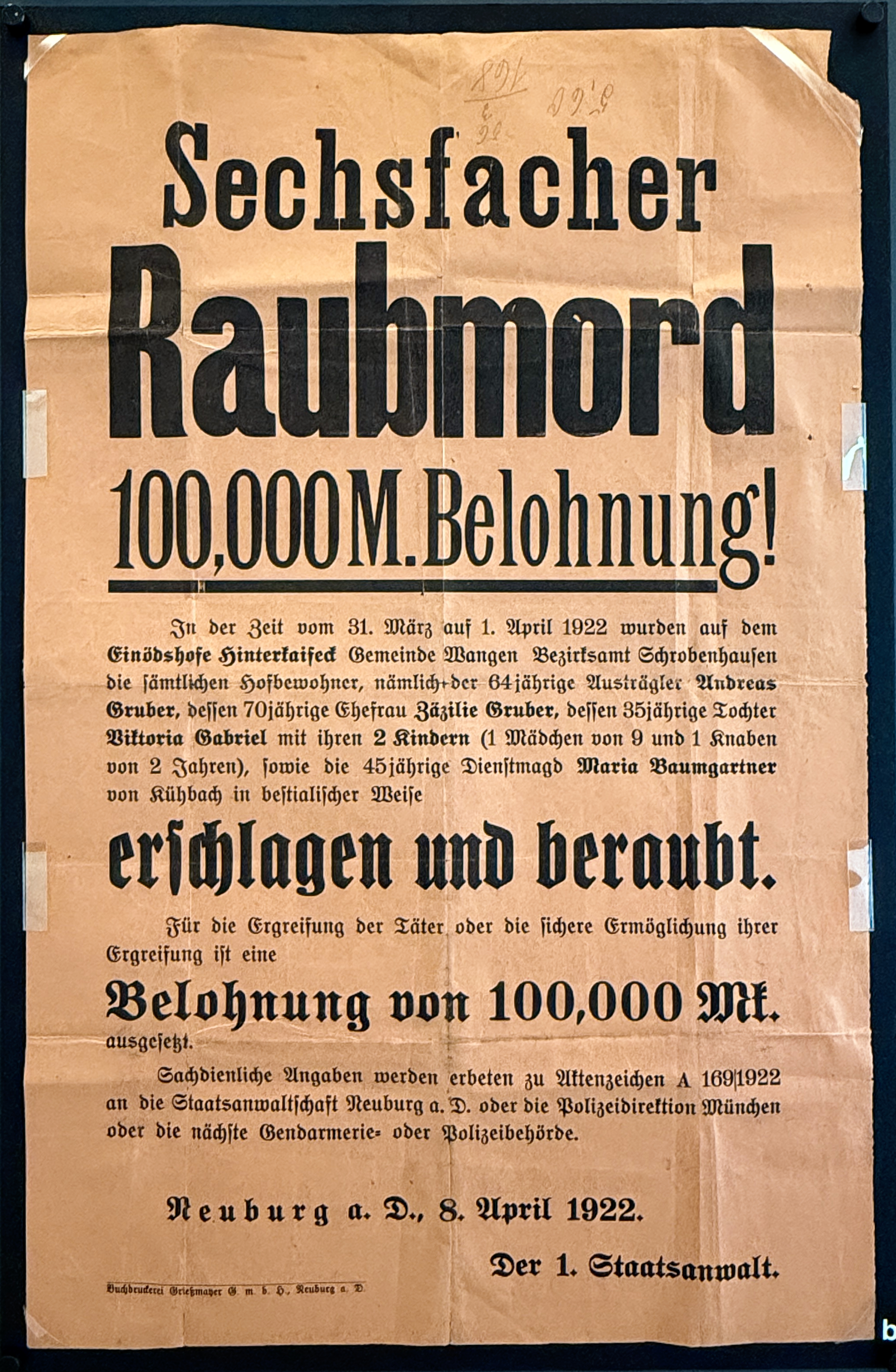
Reward poster

An investigative team from Munich, led by Inspector Georg Reingruber, was assigned to solve the killings. However, initial investigations were hampered by the contamination of the crime scene by onlookers who had moved around the bodies and potential items of evidence, and had even cooked meals in the kitchen. On 5 April, the day after the discoveries, court physician Johann Baptist Aumüller performed autopsies inside the barn. It was established that a mattock was the most likely murder weapon, although the weapon itself was not initially found at the scene. Evidence showed that the younger Cäzilia had been alive for several hours after the assault—she had torn her hair out in tufts while lying in the straw. The skulls of the victims were removed and sent to Munich for further examination.

First suspecting the motive to be robbery, investigators questioned travelling craftsmen, vagrants and several inhabitants from the surrounding villages. However, they abandoned this line of inquiry when a large amount of money was found at the house. It became apparent that the perpetrator(s) had remained at the farm for several days following the murders; someone had recently fed the cattle, consumed the entire supply of bread from the kitchen and had recently cut meat from the pantry.

With no clear motive to be gleaned from the crime scene, police began to formulate a list of suspects. Despite repeated arrests, no murderer was ever found, and the case was officially closed in 1955. The last interrogations took place in 1986, before Detective Chief Superintendent Konrad Müller-Thumann retired.

=== Inconsistencies ===
In the inspection record of the court commission, it was noted that the victims were probably drawn to the barn by noises from the restless animals. This theory may not be plausible however, as investigators discovered that noise from the barn could not be heard from the house.

At 3:00 a.m. on 1 April, on the night of the murders, a farmer named Simon Reißländer, travelling to his home near Brunnen, saw two mysterious figures standing at the edge of the forest near Hinterkaifeck. When the strangers saw him, they turned around so that their faces could not be seen. The following night, an artisan named Michael Plöckl happened to pass by Hinterkaifeck, where he observed smoke indicating that the oven was being heated. An unidentified occupant of the house approached Plöckl and blinded his vision with a lantern, whereupon he hastily continued on his way. Plöckl also noticed that the smoke had a revolting smell. This report was not investigated, and no examination of the oven was conducted to determine what might have been burned inside.

In May 1927, a stranger was said to have stopped a resident of Waidhofen at midnight, asked him questions about the murders, then loudly identified himself as the murderer before running into a forest. The stranger was never identified.

== Suspects ==
=== Karl Gabriel ===
Karl Gabriel, Viktoria's husband, was reportedly killed in action while fighting in France. However, his body was never recovered. After the murders, speculation arose as to whether Karl had in fact died in the war. After the end of the Second World War, war captives from the Schrobenhausen region who were released prematurely from Soviet captivity claimed that they had been sent home by a German-speaking Soviet officer who claimed to be the Hinterkaifeck murderer. However, some of the men later revised their statements, diminishing their credibility. Some theorized that the officer might have been Gabriel, due to reports that Gabriel had been seen after his reported death and had divulged a desire to relocate to the Soviet Union. Josef Bichler and Nikolaus Haas, two soldiers who served with Gabriel and survived the war, reported having positively identified his body in the field.

=== Lorenz Schlittenbauer ===
Shortly after the death of his first wife in 1918, Schlittenbauer embarked on a relationship with Viktoria Gruber. He came under suspicion early in the investigation due to several suspicious actions following the discovery of the bodies. When Schlittenbauer, Pöll and Sigl arrived at Hinterkaifeck to investigate the Gruber family's disappearance, they found all of the doors locked and broke through a gate to enter the barn. However, immediately after finding the bodies in the barn, Schlittenbauer apparently unlocked the front door without issue and entered the house alone. A key had gone missing from the Gruber household several days before the murders, raising the possibility that Schlittenbauer had been given the key, perhaps by Viktoria. When asked why he had entered the house alone when it was unclear whether the murderer was still present, Schlittenbauer allegedly stated that he went to look for Josef. Schlittenbauer is known to have disturbed the bodies at the scene, potentially compromising the investigation.

In the years following the murders, Schlittenbauer remained under suspicion. Comments attributed to Schlittenbauer were seen as indicating knowledge of details that only the killer would recall. According to official case files, Schlittenbauer was discovered visiting the remains of the demolished Hinterkaifeck in 1925; when asked why he was there, Schlittenbauer stated that the killer's attempt to bury the family's remains in the barn had been hindered by frozen ground. This suggested that Schlittenbauer had intimate knowledge of the conditions of the ground at the farmstead during the murders, although being a neighbour and familiar with the local land, he may have been making an educated guess. Before his death in 1941, Schlittenbauer conducted and won several civil claims for slander against persons who described him as the "murderer of Hinterkaifeck."

=== Gump brothers ===
Adolf Gump was identified as a suspect as early as 9 April 1922, the week following the murders, due to his connections to a far-right paramilitary organisation called the Freikorps Oberland. As a Freikorps member, Gump was said to have participated in the murder of nine farmers in Upper Silesia during the Polish uprising in 1921. A warrant had been issued for Gump's arrest by the district court of Opole in connection with these murders.

In 1951, prosecutor Andreas Popp questioned Gump and his brother Anton about the Hinterkaifeck murders. Adolf and Anton's sister, Kreszentia Mayer, claimed on her deathbed that the brothers had committed the murders. As a result, Anton was remanded to police custody; Adolf had already died in 1944. After a short time, however, Anton was released, and in 1954, the case against him was finally discontinued because he could not be proven to have participated in the murders.

=== Karl S. and Andreas S. ===
In 1971, a woman identified as "Therese T." wrote a letter citing an event in her youth: at the age of 12, she had witnessed her mother receiving a visit from the mother of brothers identified as 'Karl S.' and 'Andreas S.' The woman claimed that her sons, from Sattelberg, had committed the murders at Hinterkaifeck. The mother reportedly said that "Andreas regretted that he lost his penknife" in the course of the conversation. In fact, when the farmstead was demolished in 1923, a penknife was discovered that could not be clearly assigned to anyone. However, the knife could have easily belonged to one of the victims. This line of inquiry was followed without result. Kreszenz Rieger, the former maid of Hinterkaifeck, was certain she had already seen the penknife in the yard during her service.

=== Peter Weber ===
Peter Weber was named a suspect by Josef Betz. The two worked together in the winter of 1919–20 as labourers, sharing a room. According to Betz, Weber spoke of a remote farm called Hinterkaifeck and alluded to personal knowledge about the Gruber family, including the incest between Andreas and Viktoria (However, this was public knowledge since the 1915 trial.) Betz testified in a hearing that Weber had suggested killing Andreas to steal the family's money. When Betz did not respond to the offer, Weber dropped the subject.

=== Bichler brothers and Georg Siegl ===
Kreszenz Rieger, the Gruber family's original maid, worked at Hinterkaifeck between November 1920 and September 1921. She suspected the brothers Anton and Karl Bichler (brothers of the aforementioned Josef Bichler) of having committed the murders. Anton had helped with the potato harvest at Hinterkaifeck and was therefore familiar with the premises. Rieger reported that Bichler had often spoken of the Gruber family and suggested they ought to be dead. She also emphasised in her interrogation that the Grubers' dog, who barked at almost all visitors, never barked at Anton. In addition, she reported speaking with a stranger through her window on the night of the murders, believing him to be Anton's brother Karl. Rieger suspected the Bichlers committed the murder together with Georg Siegl, a Hinterkaifeck farmhand who knew of the family fortune. Siegl was alleged to have broken into the house in November 1920 and stolen a number of items, a claim he rejected. Siegl did admit, however, that he had carved the handle of the mattock when working at Hinterkaifeck and knew where the tool would have been kept inside the barn.

=== Thaler brothers ===
Rieger also pointed suspicion at brothers Josef and Andreas Thaler, who had committed several minor burglaries in the area before the murders. Rieger said that Josef, accompanied by an unidentified stranger, stood at her window one night and asked her questions about the family, which she did not answer. In conversation, Josef reportedly claimed to know which family member slept in which room and stated that they had a lot of money. According to Rieger's statement, Josef and the stranger looked at the machine room and turned their eyes upwards.

=== Paul Mueller ===
Author Bill James, in his book The Man from the Train, names Paul Mueller, a German migrant, as the possible murderer, noting that Mueller was the only suspect in the 1898 murder of a Massachusetts family, and based on research in American newspaper archives, theorizes from this that he may have killed dozens of victims. The Hinterkaifeck murders bear some similarities to Mueller's suspected crimes in the United States, including the slaughter of an entire family in their isolated home, use of the blunt edge of a farm tool as a weapon (a pickaxe), the moving and stacking of the bodies of the victims, and the apparent absence of robbery as a motive. James suspects that Mueller might have left the US by 1912 after private investigators and journalists began to notice and publicize patterns in family murders across state lines. James rates the chances of Mueller being the Hinterkaifeck killer as "more or less a toss-up" but concludes "there's no real reason to believe that it's not him."

== Legacy ==
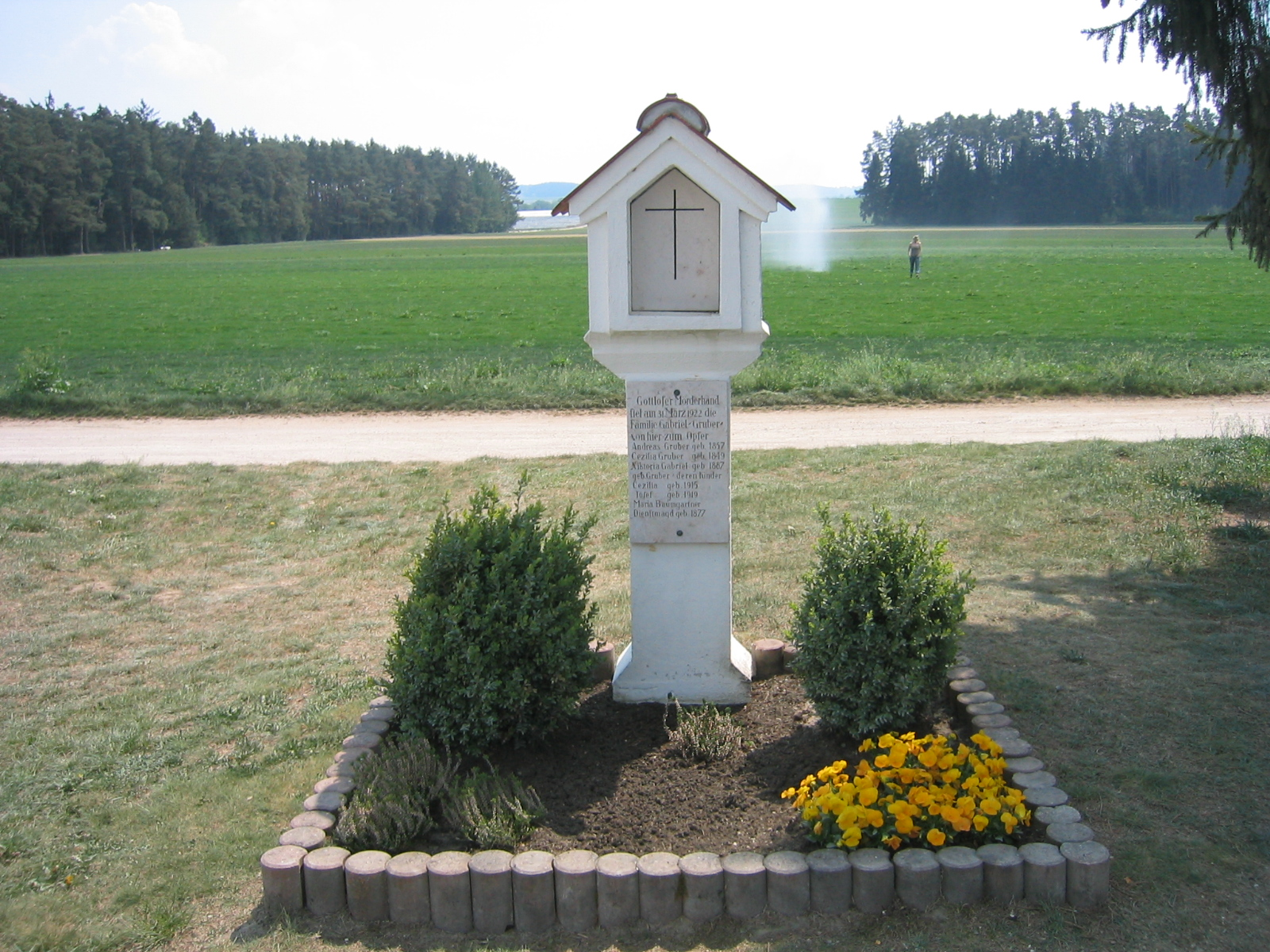
Shrine near site of former farmstead

Many books and newspaper articles have been devoted to the Hinterkaifeck murders. A series of articles by Josef Ludwig Hecker in the Schrobenhausener Zeitung revived interest in the murders.

A documentary film, Hinterkaifeck – Symbol des Unheimlichen (1981), directed and shot by Hans Gebert, was adapted from Leuschner's book. The film was shown regularly in Ingolstadt. Ten years later, in 1991, Reinhard Keilich's play Hinterkaifeck – Deutschlands geheimnisvollster Mordfall (1991) was produced, and a documentary, produced by Kurt K. Hieber, was shown on television and in local cinemas. Also in 1991, radio station Funkhaus Ingolstadt broadcast a documentary, Hinterkaifeck – auf den Spuren eines Mörders, and the Munich tabloid newspaper Abendzeitung ran a series of articles called Die sechs Toten vom Einödhof – Bayerns rätselhaftestes Verbrechen.

German author Andrea Maria Schenkel published the novel Tannöd in 2006, presenting a fictionalized account of the murders, although the setting and names of those involved were changed. The novel sold over one million copies, was adapted into a film in 2009 and has been translated into twenty languages.

In 2007, fifteen police academy students from Fürstenfeldbruck examined the case using modern criminal investigation techniques. In their final report (in German) they confirmed the meticulousness of the original investigation but criticized the lack of professional forensics. In particular, the failure to take fingerprints was criticized, as this was already common practice during the period. Although it is almost certain that the murderer(s) can no longer be identified, all authors of the report independently agreed on who the main suspect in the case was. However, the suspect's name was not mentioned out of consideration for his descendants.

The murders were the subject of season 2, episode 3 of the Amazon TV series Lore, released in 2018.

== See also ==
- Axe murder – Murder in which the victim was struck and killed by an axe, hatchet or billhook
- List of unsolved murders (1900–1979)

== Bibliography ==
- Guido Golla (2016). Hinterkaifeck: Autopsie eines Sechsfachmordes. Norderstedt, ISBN 978-3-741239-53-3.
