= Andreas Mehltretter =

German politician

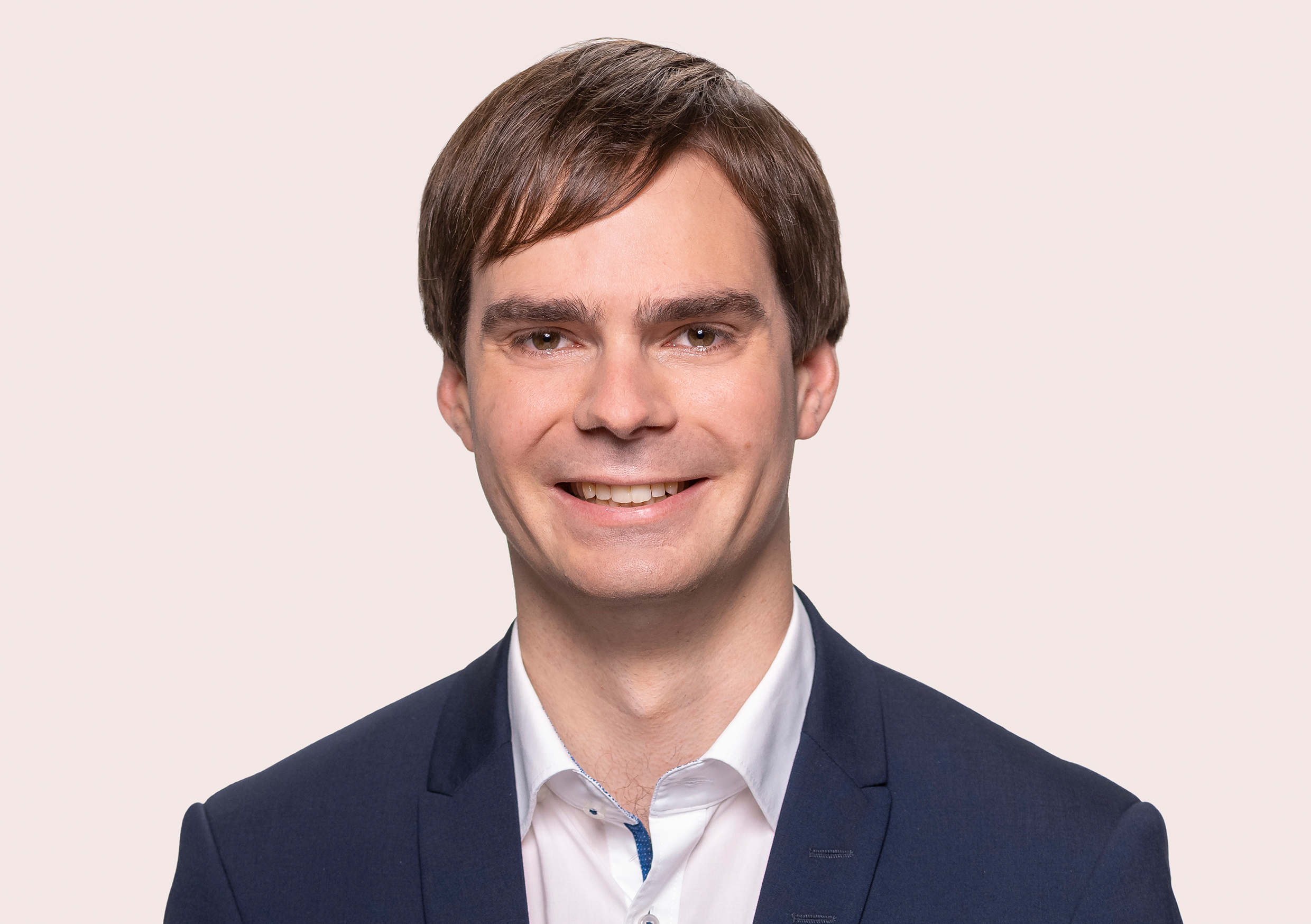
- Mehltretter in 2021

Member of the Bundestag
- Incumbent
- Assumed office 2021

Personal details
- Born: 10 December 1991 (age 34) Moosburg an der Isar, Germany
- Party: SPD
- Education: LMU Munich

Andreas Mehltretter (born 10 December 1991 in Moosburg an der Isar, Bavaria) is a German politician of the Social Democratic Party (SPD) who has been serving as a member of the German Bundestag since 2021.

== Early life and education ==
Mehltretter was born 1991 in the Bavarian town of Moosburg an der Isar. Mehltretter graduated from the Dom-Gymnasium Freising in 2011 and went on to study economics at LMU Munich and at the University of Wisconsin–Madison. He completed his master's degree in 2017.

Since then, Mehltretter has been working as a self-employed IT service provider as well as working on his doctorate on the connection between arms trade and intra-state conflicts at the Geschwister-Scholl-Institut.

== Political career ==
=== Career in local politics ===
In 2012, Mehltretter joined the SPD and is chairman of the SPD sub-district of Freising. In the 2020 Bavarian local elections, he was elected to the Freising City Council and is the speaker for economy and digitalization of the city of Freising. Before his election to the City Council, he was the spokesman of the Agenda21 group Building, Housing and Transport.

=== Member of the German Parliament, 2021–present ===
In 2017 and 2021, Mehltretter ran as a direct candidate of the SPD in the Bundestag constituency of Freising, and gained a seat in the Bundestag in 2021 through the state list. In parliament, he is a full member of the Committee on Climate Protection and Energy as well as a deputy member of the Committee on Economic Affairs and the Finance Committee.

Within his parliamentary group, Mehltretter belongs to the Parliamentary Left, a left-wing movement.

== Other activities ==
- Nuclear Waste Disposal Fund (KENFO), Alternate Member of the Board of Trustees (since 2022)
