= Konrad Baur =

German politician (born 1988)

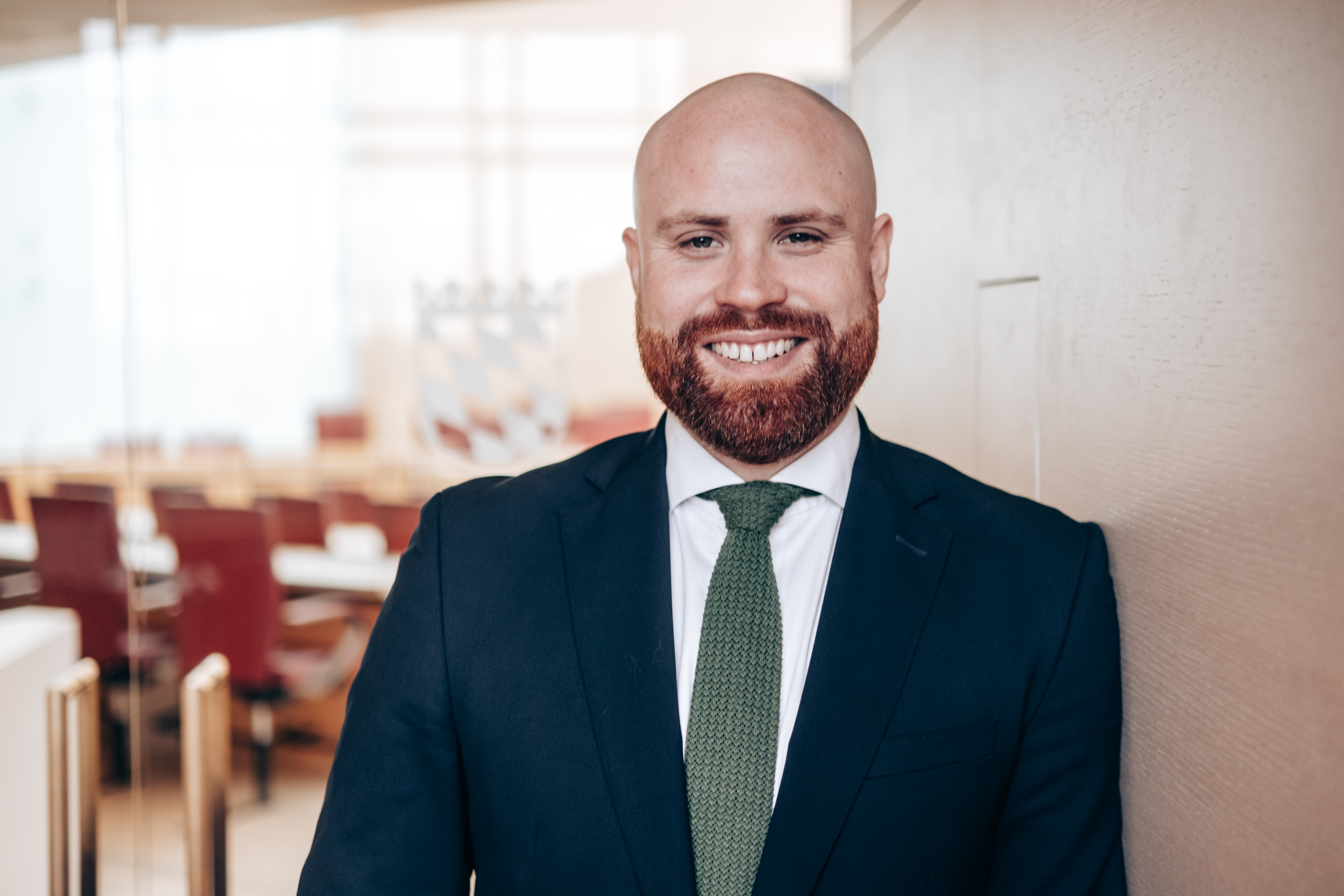
- Baur in 2023

Member of the Landtag of Bavaria
- Incumbent
- Assumed office 30 October 2023
- Preceded by: Klaus Steiner
- Constituency: Traunstein

Personal details
- Born: 12 May 1988 (age 37) Moosburg an der Isar
- Party: Christian Social Union (since 2011)

Konrad Michael Baur (born 12 May 1988 in Moosburg an der Isar) is a German politician serving as a member of the Landtag of Bavaria since 2023. He has served as group leader of the Christian Social Union in the city council of Traunstein since 2020.
