= Christian Moser (politician) =

German politician (born 1989)

Christian Moser MdB

Member of the Bundestag; for Freising
- Incumbent
- Assumed office 25 March 2025
- Preceded by: Erich Irlstorfer

Personal details
- Born: 14 November 1989 (age 36) Pfaffenhofen an der Ilm, West Germany
- Party: Christian Social Union
- Children: 1
- Education: University of Passau

Christian Anton Moser (born 14 November 1989) is a German politician and lawyer who was elected as a member of the Bundestag in 2025. He has served as chairman of the Christian Social Union in the city council of Pfaffenhofen an der Ilm since 2020.
