= Schrobenhausen (Verwaltungsgemeinschaft) =

- Verwaltungsgemeinschaft
- Location of Schrobenhausen within Neuburg-Schrobenhausen district
- Interactive map of Schrobenhausen
- Location within Germany Location within Bavaria
- Coordinates: 48°34′N 11°16′E
- Country: Germany
- State: Bavaria
- Admin. region: Upper Bavaria
- District: Neuburg-Schrobenhausen
- Seat: Schrobenhausen
- Subdivisions: 5 municipalities

Area
  - Total: 136.18 km^{2} (52.58 sq mi)

Population (2025-12-31)
  - Total: 9,857
  - Density: 72.38/km^{2} (187.5/sq mi)
- Time zone: UTC+01:00 (CET)
  - Summer (DST): UTC+02:00 (CEST)
- Website: www.vgem-sob.de

Schrobenhausen is a Verwaltungsgemeinschaft (municipal association) in the district Neuburg-Schrobenhausen in Bavaria, Germany. Its seat is in Schrobenhausen, itself not part of the Verwaltungsgemeinschaft.

It consists of the following municipalities:

1. Berg im Gau
2. Brunnen
3. Gachenbach
4. Langenmosen
5. Waidhofen
