= Andrea Maria Schenkel =

German writer (born 1962)

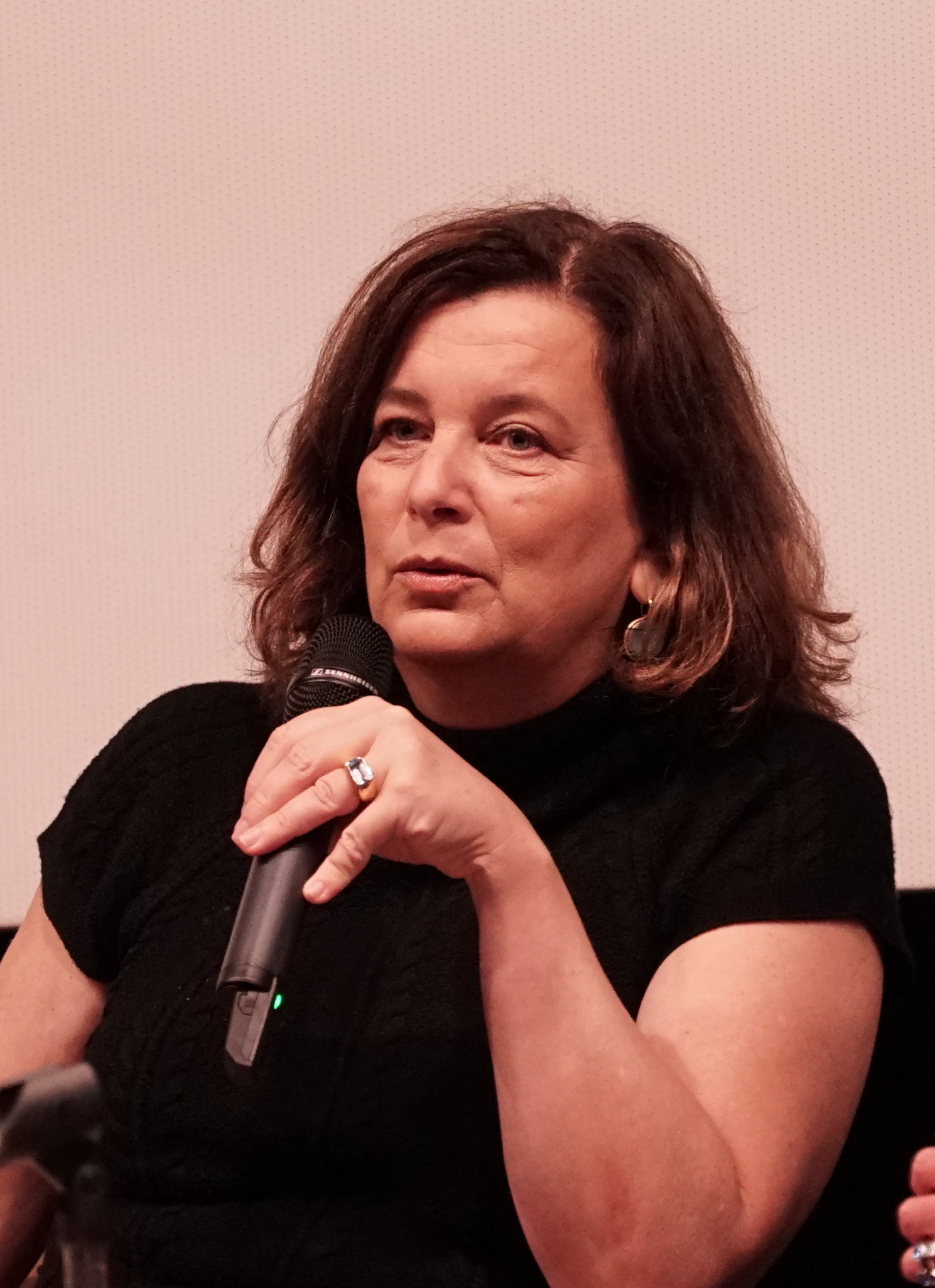
(2018)

Andrea Maria Schenkel (born 21 March 1962 in Regensburg, West Germany) is a German writer. She received the Corine Literature Prize (2007).

== Biography ==
She published her debut novel Tannöd in 2006. Based on the Hinterkaifeck murder in the 1920s, Schenkel's fictional account takes place in the 1950s. She describes, in ghastly and suspenseful detail, how a small Bavarian village, called Tannöd, became the unlikely site of a horrific crime. In her novel, a whole family – the farmer, his wife and children, the maidservants and farm laborers – are all killed in one night. Nobody had liked the family: they had been unfriendly, greedy and crabby. But now after the outrage, fear dominates life in the village. Nobody knows the murderer. Slowly, anxious and shocked every witness gives his statement. Speculation and assumptions about the case are described in a direct, merciless and impressive manner. With her debut novel, Andrea Schenkel presents not only thrilling crime and fiction. She also draws the pitiless portraits of a bigoted and unromantic rural society influenced by traumatic relations that finally lead to death. More than one million copies were sold in Germany. The work has been published in more than 20 languages, with foreign rights sold to France (Actes Sud), Italy (Riuniti), the Netherlands (Signature), Sweden (Ersatz), Norway and Denmark. In 2009, Constantin Film released Tannöd, starring Julia Jentsch and Volker Bruch. Her first novel won the Deutscher Krimi Preis (German award for crime thrillers) in the category "Best National Crime Thriller 2007". In 2008, Tannöd won Sweden's Martin Beck Award, which is given to the best detective story translated into Swedish. The English translation of the novel was released by Quercus Publishing on 5 June 2008. The title is The Murder Farm. Quercus released a paperback edition of "The Murder Farm" on 26 December 2008. In June 2014, Quercus published the work in the United States, which The New York Times announced in a profile of Schenkel.

In August 2007, Schenkel published her second novel, Kalteis, which focuses on a serial killer in 1930s Germany. It is set in Munich where female bodies keep surfacing around the city and the circumstantial evidence points to the unassuming and married Joseph Kalteis. Kalteis also won the Deutscher Krimi Preis in the category "Best National Crime Thriller 2008" – the first time an author won the award for two consecutive years.

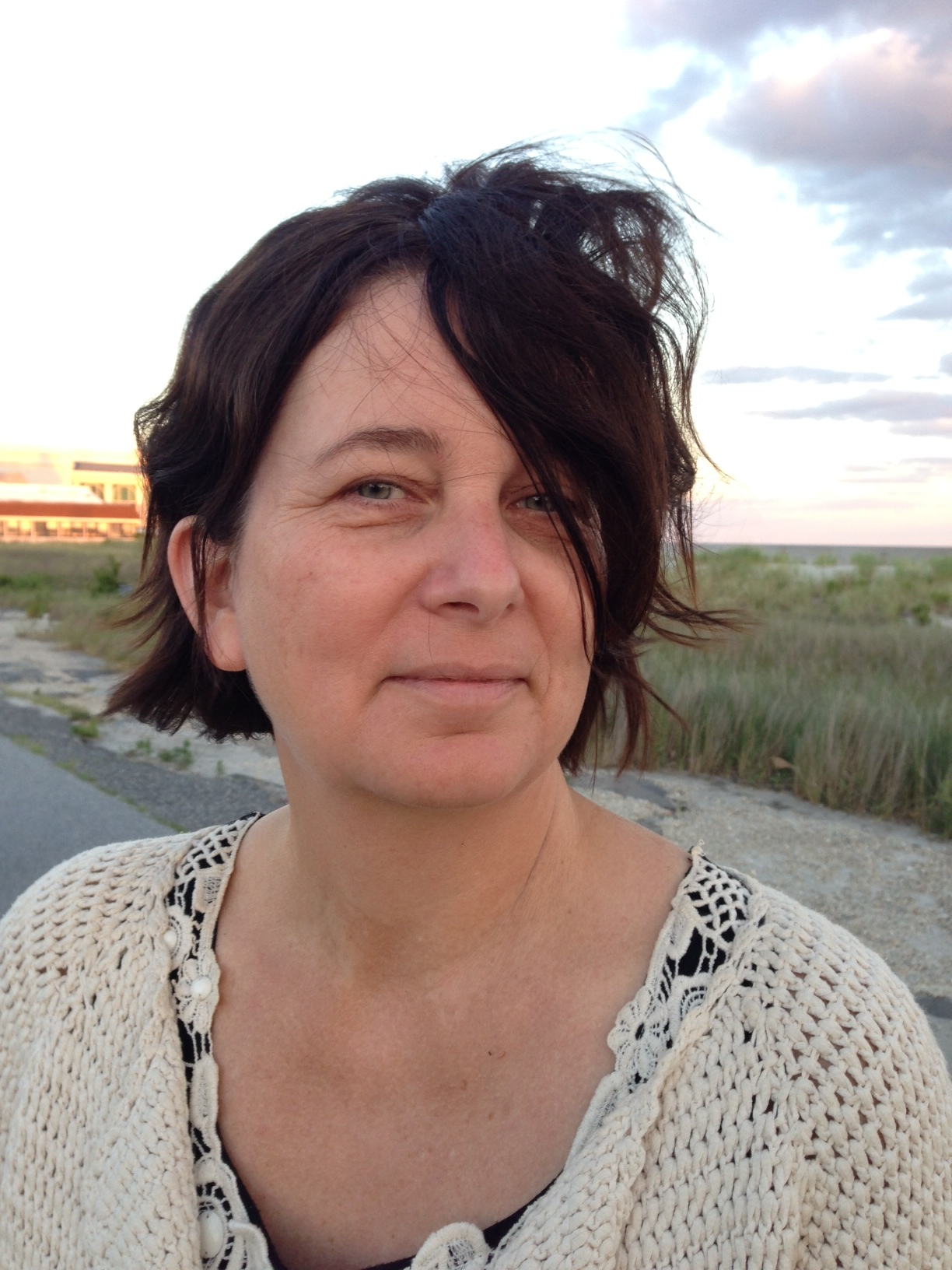
(2014)

Her third book, "Bunker," was published by Nautilus in 2009. "Finsterau" was published by Hoffmann und Campe in 2012, and by Quercus, under the title "The Dark Meadow," in 2014. Her novel, "Tauscher," was published by Hoffmann und Campe in 2013.

In June 2015, Quercus US published "Kalteis" under the title "Ice Cold," and in March 2016, Hoffman und Campe will publish her next work, "Als die Liebe endlich war" ("Where Love Ends"), which takes readers from 1930s Germany to World War II-era Shanghai to 21st-century America. "Als die Liebe endlich war", was published by Hoffmann und Campe in 2016; the French version, Le bracelet, was published by Actes Sud in 2018.

Andrea Maria Schenkel lives with her family near Regensburg.

== Books ==
- The Murder Farm, Quercus Publishing, London (2008), ISBN 1-84724-366-5
- Ice Cold, Quercus Publishing, London (2009)
- Bunker, Quercus Publishing, London (2011)
- The Dark Meadow, Quercus Publishing, London (2012); Finsterau, Hoffmann und Campe (March 2012)
- Täuscher, Hoffmann und Campe (September 2013)
- Als die Liebe endlich war, Hoffmann und Campe (March 2016)
