= Erich Irlstorfer =

German politician (born 1970)

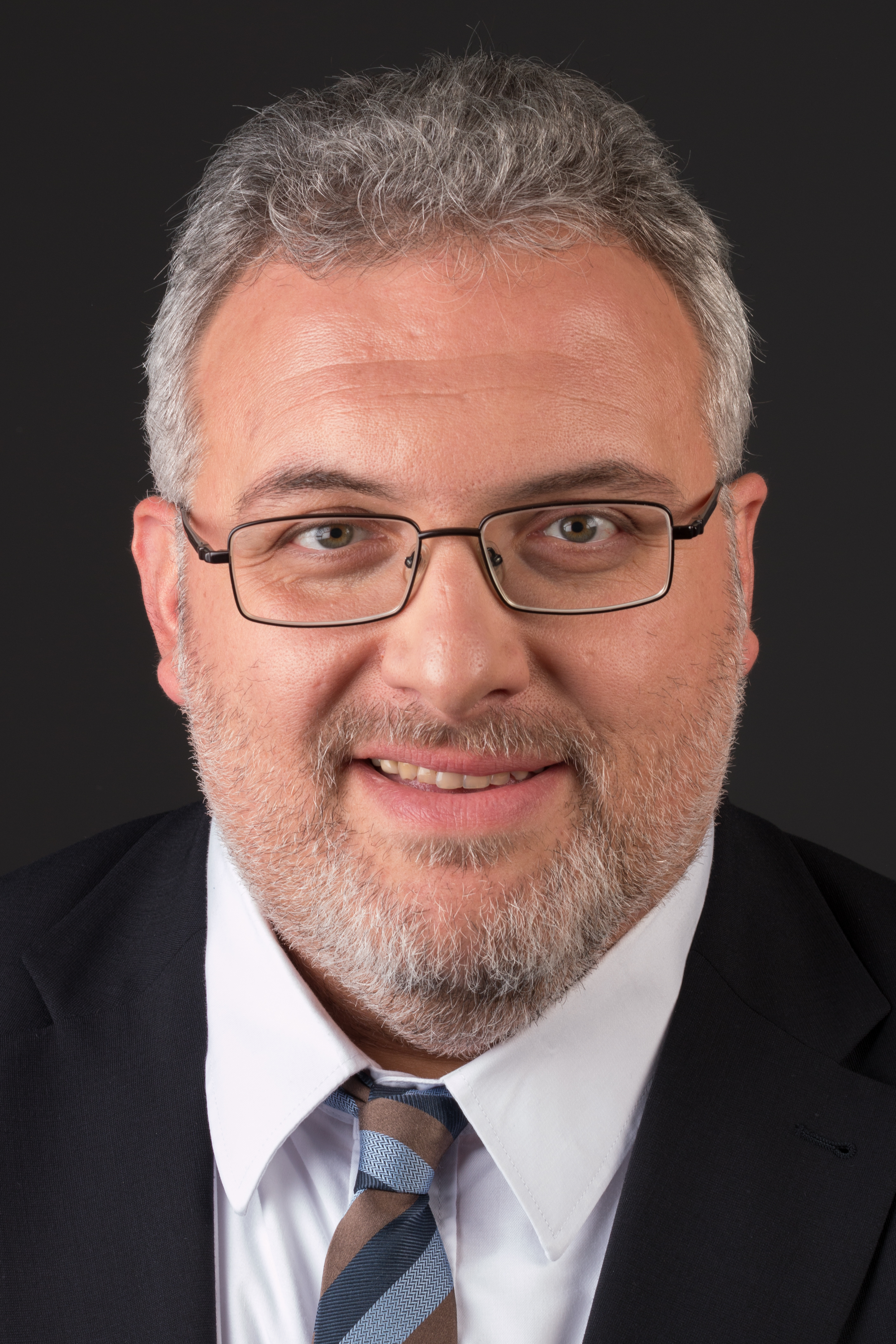
- Irlstorfer in 2014

Member of the Bundestag; for Freising
- In office 22 October 2013 – 25 March 2025
- Preceded by: Franz Obermeier
- Succeeded by: Christian Moser

Personal details
- Born: 27 May 1970 (age 56) Freising, West Germany
- Party: Christian Social Union
- Children: 2

Erich Irlstorfer (born 27 May 1970) is a German politician of the Christian Social Union in Bavaria (CSU) who has been serving as a member of the Bundestag from the state of Bavaria from 2013 to 2025.

== Political career ==
Irlstorfer became a member of the Bundestag in the 2013 German federal election, representing the Freising district. In parliament, he has since been a member of the Committee on Health (since 2013) and the Subcommittee on Global Health (since 2018).

In the negotiations to form a coalition government under the leadership of Chancellor Angela Merkel following the 2017 federal elections, Irlstorfer was part of the working group on health policy, led by Hermann Gröhe, Georg Nüßlein and Malu Dreyer.
