= Leon Eckert =

German politician (born 1995)

Member of the Bundestag
- Incumbent
- Assumed office 26 October 2021
- Constituency: Bavaria

Personal details
- Born: 9 April 1995 (age 31) Munich, Germany
- Party: Alliance 90/The Greens
- Education: Technical University of Munich

Leon Eckert (born 9 April 1995 in Munich) is a German politician of the Alliance 90/The Greens who has been serving as member of the Bundestag since the 2021 German federal election, representing the Freising district.

== Life ==
In 2014, Eckert graduated with his general higher education entrance qualification from the Robert Bosch Technical College for Business, Administration and Law in Munich. He then studied technology and management-oriented business administration at the Technical University of Munich until 2019, while also studying history and political science at LMU Munich from 2015 to 2020. He completed both degree programmes with a Bachelor's degree. From 2019 to 2022, he was enrolled in the Master's degree programme in Management and Technology at the Technical University of Munich. From 2017 to 2019, he was Managing Director and co-founder of Kleider Machen Bräute GmbH. From 2016 to 2018, Eckert was a student assistant in the constituency office of Beate Walter-Rosenheimer. Eckert worked as a local government officer for GRIBS from 2019 until his election in the German Bundestag. He is an active member of the Eching volunteer fire brigade.

== Political career ==
In parliament, Eckert serves on the Committee on Internal Affairs and the Audit Committee. He has been a member of Bündnis 90/Die Grünen since 2011. He was previously active in the Green Youth. His interest in politics was sparked by the nuclear disaster in Fukushima and the referendum on the third runway at Munich Airport.

=== Local politics ===
Together with Axel Reiß and Florian Stang, Eckert founded his local association in his hometown of Eching in 2013. In 2014, the party won two seats in the local council elections, one of which Eckert took over. In his first term as a local councillor in Eching, he was a full member of the building, planning and environment committee. His political focus included improving cycling in the municipality; he was elected as the first cycling officer for the municipality of Eching in 2018. l The municipality of Eching has been certified as a bicycle-friendly municipality since 2022. Since the 2020 local elections, he has also been the third mayor of the municipality of Eching and a member of the Freising district council.

=== German Bundestag ===
In the 2021 Bundestag election, Eckert stood as a candidate in the Freising constituency and achieved 3rd place with 12.5% of the first votes. Nevertheless, he entered the German Bundestag in 18th place on the Bavarian state list; Leon Eckert is a full member of the Committee on Home Affairs and the Audit Committee, of which he is deputy chairman. He is a deputy member of the Budget Committee and the Transport Committee.

Eckert is working for the Green parliamentary group in the 20th parliamentary term on issues such as civil defence and disaster control as well as emergency response and voluntary work.

=== Other honorary posts ===
Leon Eckert has been Chairman of the German Committee for Disaster Risk Reduction (DKKV) since 2022.

== Other activities ==
- German Foundation for Active Citizenship and Volunteering (DSEE), Ex-Officio Member of the Board of Trustees (since 2022)
- German Federation for the Environment and Nature Conservation (BUND), Member (since 2021)
- German United Services Trade Union (ver.di), Member (since 2020)
- German Cyclist’s Association (ADFC), Member (since 2017)
- Member of the district board of the BRK district association Freising
- Volunteer fire brigade Eching
- Volunteer fire brigade Weng
- Member and part of the supervisory board of Bürgerenergiegenossenschaft Freisinger Land
- Freising citizens' association
- Zukunftsforum Öffentliche Sicherheit e.V.
