= Gerhard Wiesheu =

German banker

- Born: February 12, 1962 (age 64); Moosburg an der Isar, Germany
- Education: University of Duisburg-Essen
- Occupation: Banker
- Spouse: Yumiko Wiesheu (m. 1985)
- Children: 2

Gerhard Wiesheu (born February 12, 1962) is a German banker who became CEO of Metzler Bank and later sat on supervisory board of several financial companies as well as being chairman of the board of the German-Japanese Business Association.

== Early life and education ==
Gerhard Wiesheu was born in Moosburg an der Isar, Germany. He received a degree in business administration from the University of Applied Sciences Landshut in 1987 and completed postgraduate studies in East Asian economics at the University of Duisburg-Essen in 1989.

Gerhard Wiesheu is married to Yumiko Wiesheu; together they have two children.

== Career ==
Wiesheu completed an investment banking trainee program in 1987 and then held various positions at Commerzbank.

In 1991, he joined the Commerzbank subsidiary Commerz International Capital Management GmbH (CICM) in Frankfurt. He was managing director of CICM's Japanese branch in Tokyo from 1994 to 1999. During this time, he was also a member of the board of directors of the Japanese Asset Management Association in Tokyo.

In 2001, Wiesheu joined Metzler Bank and became CEO of B. Metzler seel. Sohn & Co. AG in 2023. Until Metzler's legal form was changed in 2021, Wiesheu was also a member of the partners’ committee at Metzler Bank, and from 2015 to 2021, he was one of Metzler's personally liable partners.

From 2020 to 2024, Wiesheu was president of Frankfurt Main Finance, an initiative of the city of Frankfurt and the eurozone.

Wiesheu is a member of several financial sector boards, such as the supervisory boards at Nomura Asset Management Europe, DWS Investment GmbH and WWK Allgemeine Versicherung AG. Furthermore, he is chairman of the supervisory board of WWK Lebensversicherung a. G. Wiesheu was also a member of the advisory board at German Association for Financial Analysis and Asset Management and the exchange councils of the Frankfurt Stock Exchange. In addition, Wiesheu has been a member of the executive board and the assembly of delegates of the Association of German Banks since July 2023.

== Honorary posts ==
Gerhard Wiesheu was elected chairman of the board of the German-Japanese Business Association (DJW) in Düsseldorf in 2011 and has chaired the board of trustees of the Japanese-German Center Berlin (JDZB) since 2014. In addition, he has been a representative of the advisory board of the German-Japanese Society Frankfurt (DJG) since 2012.

He is also part of the board of trustees of the Interdisciplinary Center for East Asian Studies at Goethe University Frankfurt and an honorary member of the board of trustees of the Society of Friends of Bayreuth.

Furthermore, Wiesheu is chairman of the board of trustees of the Georg Speyer Haus and a member of the board of trustees of the Paul Ehrlich Foundation.

== Delegation trips ==
Gerhard Wiesheu accompanied former German chancellor Angela Merkel and several cabinet members of the German government on delegation trips on several occasions. In 2015 and 2019, for example, he was part of the economic delegation to Japan.

He served as a spokesman for the economic delegation of German chancellor Olaf Scholz on his first trip to Japan in 2022 and in 2023 for the first German-Japanese government consultations.

== Awards ==
In 2015, Wiesheu was awarded the Special Award of the Foreign Minister of Japan in recognition of his long-standing commitment to German-Japanese relations.

In May 2022, Wiesheu received the Order of Merit of the Federal Republic of Germany (First Class). He received the award from Hesse's former prime minister Volker Bouffier.
