= Tannöd =

2006 German novel by Andrea Maria Schenkel

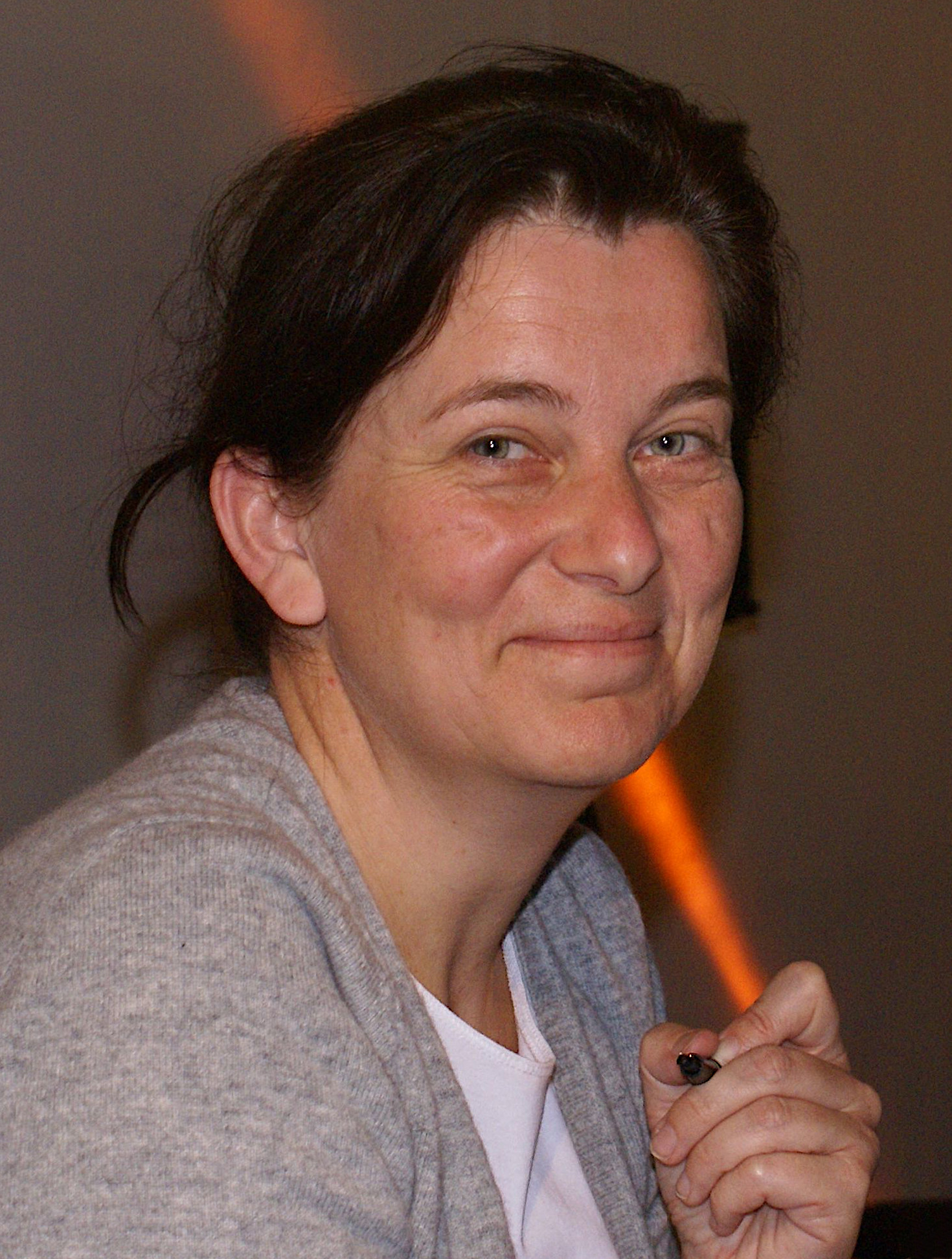
Andrea Maria Schenkel

Tannöd is a novel by German author Andrea Maria Schenkel. It was first published in Germany in January 2006 and was adapted for film in 2009.

== Contents ==
The novel narrates the story of a multiple murder at an isolated Bavarian farm called Tannöd in the 1950s. The points of view of the victims, the witnesses, and the perpetrator are intertwined in 39 short passages. Through these largely separate testimonies, the reader gradually builds a complete picture of the events that lead a rural family, headed by a tyrannical, abusive father to all be brutally murdered.

== Background ==
The novel is based on the unsolved murder of an entire family in 1922 on the farmstead Hinterkaifeck, Bavaria.

== Adaptations ==
A film adaptation of the novel with the same title Tannöd was released in cinemas in Germany on 19 November 2009, directed by Bettina Oberli (Wüste-Film West) and starring Julia Jentsch, Monica Bleibtreu, and Volker Bruch.

== Awards ==
- 2007: Deutscher Krimi Preis, Friedrich Glauser Prize
- 2008: Swedish Crime Fiction Prize
- Audiobook: CORINE-Weltbild-Leserpreis

== Publication history ==
By May 2009 one million copies had been sold of the novel Tannöd. The English translation of the novel was released by Quercus Publishing on 5 June 2008. The title is The Murder Farm. Quercus released a paperback edition of The Murder Farm on 26 December 2008.

== Bibliography ==
- Andrea Maria Schenkel: Tannöd, Edition Nautilus, Hamburg 2006, ISBN 978-3-89401-479-7
- Andrea Maria Schenkel: Tannöd, btb, Munich 2008, ISBN 978-3-442-73673-7
