= Matthias Schranner =

Founder of the Schranner Negotiation Institute (born 1964)

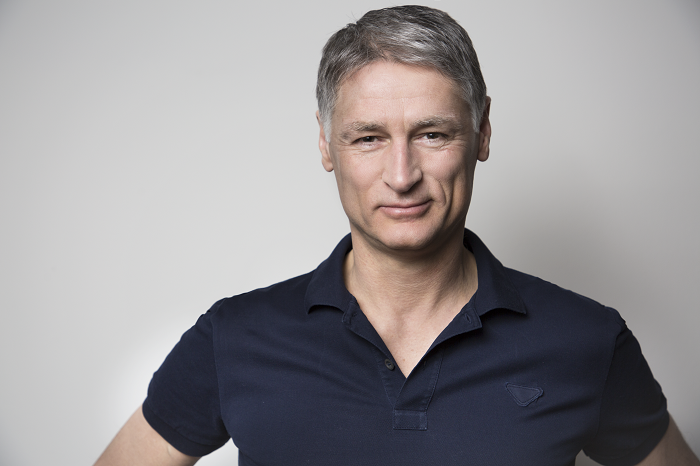
- Born: 4 January 1964 (age 62); Moosburg an der Isar, Germany
- Education: Master of Law, LMU Munich
- Occupation: International Negotiation Expert
- Organization: Schranner Negotiation Institute
- Notable work: Negotiations on the Edge, Costly Mistakes
- Website: https://www.schranner.com/

Matthias Schranner (born 4 January 1964 in Moosburg an der Isar) is a consultant and ex-hostage negotiator, who worked for the German police. He is CEO and founder of the Schranner Negotiation Institute in Switzerland, and of Schranner Negotiation LLC in the United States. He is the author of the books Negotiations on the Edge and Costly Mistakes, as well as an adjunct professor at the University of St. Gallen and the University of Warwick.

== Career ==
Schranner grew up in Germany and graduated from LMU Munich with a Master of Law.

Schranner started his career with the German police where he worked for 17 years. After six years of working undercover in drug enforcement, he was trained by the FBI and transferred to a special Federal Criminal Task Force for the Bundesministerium des Innern. He was responsible for overseeing crimes such as kidnappings and hostage situations.

After his career in Law Enforcement, Schranner founded the Schranner Negotiation Institute and later Schranner Negotiation LLC. He has consulted Fortune 500 companies, political parties and government leaders, as well as the United Nations.

== Selected publications ==
- Negotiations on the Edge (2011), ISBN 3033031862
- Costly Mistakes: The 7 Biggest Errors in Negotiations (2008), ISBN 978-3033031869
