= Franz Dietl =

German Roman Catholic prelate (1934–2024)

- Auxiliary Bishop Emeritus of Munich and Freising
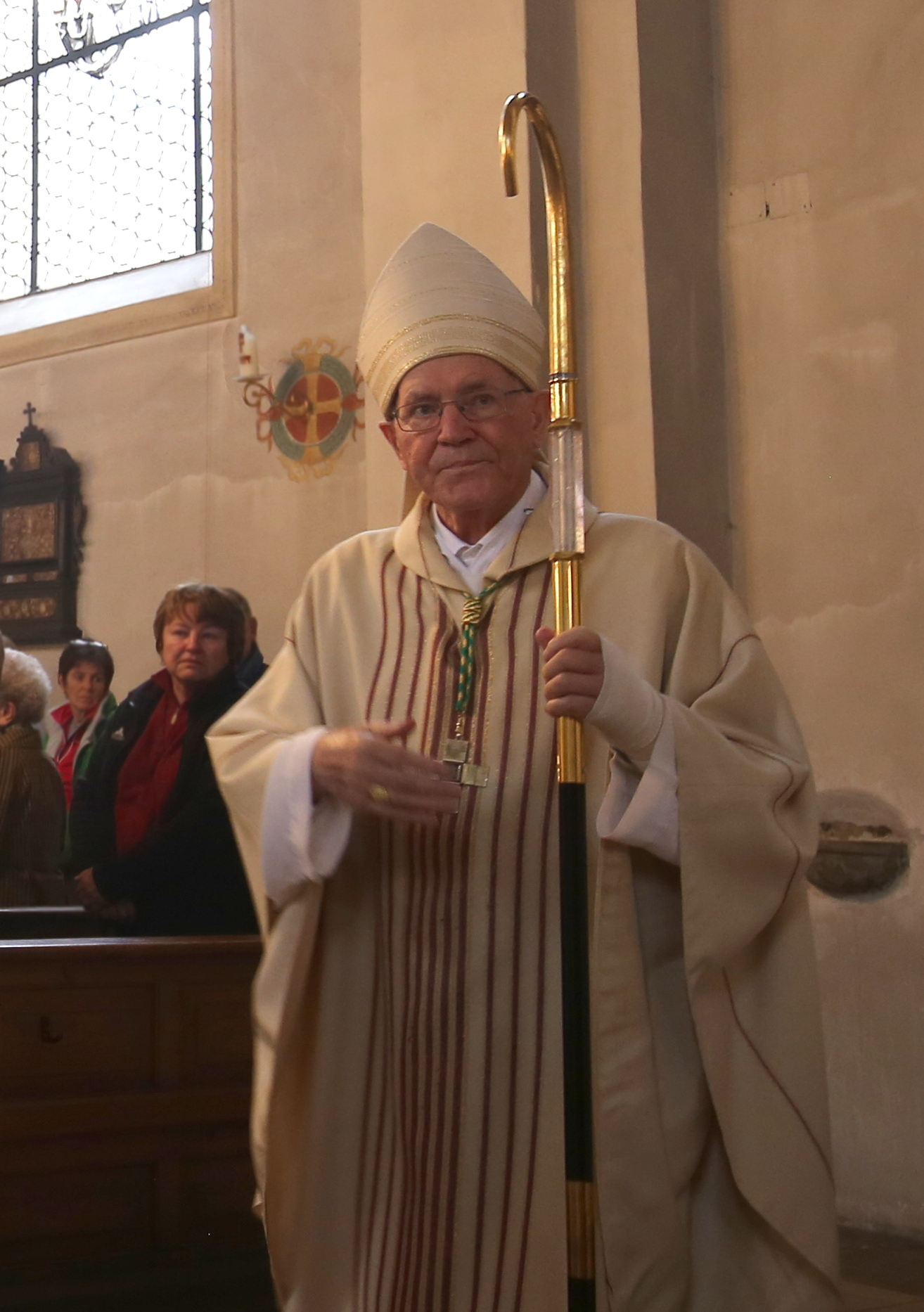
- Appointed: 22 December 1998
- Term ended: 5 January 2010
- Other post: Titular Bishop of Sebarga (1998–2024)

Orders
- Ordination: 23 August 1959
- Consecration: 7 February 1999 by Friedrich Wetter

Personal details
- Born: 20 March 1934 Moosburg an der Isar, Germany
- Died: 22 March 2024 (aged 90) Gräfelfing, Germany
- Motto: Ex toto corde
- Coat of arms

Franz Dietl (20 March 1934 – 22 March 2024) was a German Roman Catholic prelate. He served as the auxiliary bishop of the Roman Catholic Archdiocese of Munich and Freising from 1999 to 2010. He died in Gräfelfing on 22 March 2024, at the age of 90.

Catholic Church titles
Preceded by —	Auxiliary Bishop of Munich and Freising; 1998–2010	Succeeded by —
Preceded by Gáspár Ladocsi	Titular Bishop of Sebarga; 1998–2024	Succeeded by Vacant
