= Metzler Bank =

Private banking company in Germany

Coordinates: 50.1113°N 8.6731°E

B. Metzler seel. Sohn & Co.
- Company type: Aktiengesellschaft
- Industry: Banking
- Founded: 1674; 352 years ago
- Founder: Benjamin Metzler
- Headquarters: Frankfurt am Main, Germany
- Key people: Friedrich von Metzler; Gerhard Wiesheu
- Products: Investment banking Financial services Asset management
- Net income: € 2.3 million (2022)
- Total assets: € 8.3 billion (2022)
- Number of employees: 800 (2022)
- Website: www.metzler.com

The B. Metzler seel. Sohn & Co. AG is a private banking company in Frankfurt, Germany. Metzler traces its origins to a trading company established 1674 by Benjamin Metzler in Frankfurt and is Germany’s second oldest bank (after Berenberg Bank) and the world's 5th oldest.

The Metzler has been owned continuously and exclusively by the founding family since its foundation in 1674. After 1971 Friedrich von Metzler de lead the bank in the 11th generation as personally liable partner of the banking house. End of May 2018 he retired from the executive committee.

== History ==
The origins of the banking house Metzler go back to a trading company founded by Benjamin Metzler in 1674. The name B. Metzler seel. Sohn & Co. is derived from the son of the company founder Benjamin Metzler, who wanted to remember his deceased father by this naming. As early as the end of the 17th century, there was a coupling of merchandise and financial transactions due to the significant distance trade activities.

=== 18th century ===
First money and exchange transactions of the company are provable since 1728. In 1742, a son of the founder was elected to the Frankfurt Stock Exchange Board. Since then, owners of the bank have almost uninterruptedly been represented on the management body of the Frankfurt Stock Exchange and Deutsche Börse AG. The development from trading to banking was largely completed around 1760. In 1769 Friedrich Metzler became a partner in the family business, in 1771 its leader. He entered the government bond business. It began in 1779 with a loan in favor of the Electorate of Bavaria. It was followed by Palatinate as a Debtor, 1795 the Kingdom of Prussia followed with a loan of one million guilders. Also Saxe-Meiningen, the House of Nassau as well as the House of Orange-Nassau became customers of Metzler. Through his dealings with the Prussian House of Lords he was awarded the title Königlich-preußischer geheimer Kommerzienrat (Royal Prussian Secret Commercial Council).

=== 19th century ===
Towards the end of the 19th century the competition with the newly formed joint-stock banks led to a strategic orientation of the business toward the core competences of a private bank: renouncing the on-balance-sheet business and concentrating on individual financial services. Asset management was of particular importance.

=== 20th century ===
At the beginning of the 20th century, the bank restricted the current account and lending business. At the same time, the trading of securities was deliberately expanded.

In 1938, the Metzler bank was involved in the forced Aryanization of Jewish banking houses, such as the banking houses Bass & Herz de, J. Dreyfus & Co. and Jacob S.H. Stern.

In order to safeguard independence in the long term and to strengthen the capital base, the company was transformed in 1986 from a partnership into a capital company in the form of a limited joint-stock partnership. This maintained the personal liability of the management, which is characteristic of a private bank.

At the same time, B. Metzler seel. Sohn & Co. Holding AG was established as the parent company of a holding based on the Anglo-Saxon model.

Since then, the various business areas have been the responsibility of independent subsidiaries of the bank. In 1994, the B. Metzler GmbH was founded, in which the corporate finance consulting is consolidated.

The development of the bank in the 20th century was largely influenced by Albert von Metzler.

=== 21st century ===
In 2001, one office was opened in Tokyo, and another in Beijing in 2009. In 2007, the Metzler bank celebrated its 333rd anniversary. The bank, which is exclusively owned by the founding family, published the following figures in the consolidated financial statements for the financial year from 1 January 2022 to 31 December 2022:

- Total assets: €8.3 billion
- Assets under management (in Asset Management): €69 billion
- Tier 1 capital ratio: more than 20%
- Net profit: €2.3 million

The number of employees as of the end of 2022 was 800. The bank would like to remain independent. A fusion with another private bank mentioned by the business press has been repeatedly and clearly rejected by the bank.

In 2016, equity of over €200 million was reported.

== Business areas ==
The Metzler bank focuses on capital market services for institutions and private clients in its core businesses asset management, capital markets, corporate finance and private banking. Metzler Asset Management customers include the Versorgungsanstalt des Bundes und der Länder (Federal and State Utilities Agency). In addition to asset management for wealthy individuals and institutional clients, Metzler is also active in mutual funds business.

With around 800 employees, the Metzler bank runs branches or subsidiaries in Düsseldorf, Hamburg, Munich, Stuttgart, Atlanta, Los Angeles, Beijing, Seattle and Tokyo.

== Personally liable partners ==
In the history of the bank personally liable partners were active who were not members of the Metzler family, including:

- Johann Zwirlein (1687 to 1698)
- Gottfried Malß (1757 to 1771)
- Hans Hermann Reschke (1982 to 1999)
- Emmerich Müller (2005 to 2021)
- Harald Illy (2012 to 2021)
- Michael Klaus (2012 to 2020)
- Johannes Reich (2012 to 2017)
- Gerhard Wiesheu (2016 to 2021)

With the conversion into a Aktiengesellschaft (stock corporation) in 2021, the personally liable partners were appointed as members of the Executive Board of B. Metzler seel. Sohn & Co. AG.

== See also ==
- Thomas David Lukas Olsen Kidnapping of Jakob von Metzler
- List of banks in Germany
