= Langenmosen =

- Municipality
- Coat of arms

- Location of Langenmosen within Neuburg-Schrobenhausen district
- Interactive map of Langenmosen
- Location within Germany Location within Bavaria
- Coordinates: 48°36′N 11°13′E
- Country: Germany
- State: Bavaria
- Admin. region: Oberbayern
- District: Neuburg-Schrobenhausen
- Municipal assoc.: Schrobenhausen
- Subdivisions: 4 Gemeindeteile

Government
  - Mayor (2020–26): Mathilde Ahle (CSU)

Area
  - Total: 23.89 km^{2} (9.22 sq mi)
- Elevation: 403 m (1,322 ft)

Population (2025-12-31)
  - Total: 1,674
  - Density: 70.07/km^{2} (181.5/sq mi)
- Time zone: UTC+01:00 (CET)
  - Summer (DST): UTC+02:00 (CEST)
- Postal codes: 86571
- Dialling codes: 08433
- Vehicle registration: ND
- Website: www.langenmosen.de

Langenmosen is a municipality in the district of Neuburg-Schrobenhausen in Bavaria in Germany.
