= Bockhorn, Bavaria =

Bockhorn
- Municipality
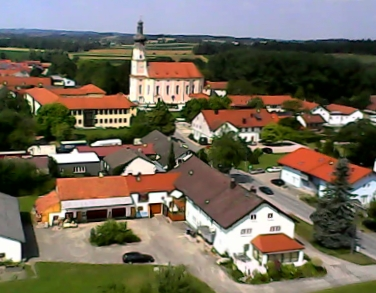
- Central part of the village

- Coat of arms

- Location of Bockhorn within Erding district
- Interactive map of Bockhorn
- Location within Germany Location within Bavaria
- Coordinates: 48°19′N 11°59′E
- Country: Germany
- State: Bavaria
- Admin. region: Oberbayern
- District: Erding

Government
  - Mayor (2020–26): Lorenz Angermaier (FW)

Area
  - Total: 47.15 km^{2} (18.20 sq mi)
- Elevation: 460 m (1,510 ft)

Population (2025-12-31)
  - Total: 4,062
  - Density: 86.15/km^{2} (223.1/sq mi)
- Time zone: UTC+01:00 (CET)
  - Summer (DST): UTC+02:00 (CEST)
- Postal codes: 85461
- Dialling codes: 08122
- Vehicle registration: ED
- Website: www.bockhorn-obb.de

Bockhorn (German pronunciation: [ˈbɔkhɔʁn]; Bavarian: Bocking) is a municipality in the district of Erding in Bavaria in Germany.
