= Brunnen, Bavaria =

Brunnen
- Municipality
- Coat of arms

- Location of Brunnen within Neuburg-Schrobenhausen district
- Interactive map of Brunnen
- Location within Germany Location within Bavaria
- Coordinates: 48°38′N 11°18′E
- Country: Germany
- State: Bavaria
- Admin. region: Oberbayern
- District: Neuburg-Schrobenhausen
- Municipal assoc.: Schrobenhausen

Government
  - Mayor (2020–26): Thomas Wagner

Area
  - Total: 32.14 km^{2} (12.41 sq mi)
- Elevation: 391 m (1,283 ft)

Population (2025-12-31)
  - Total: 1,841
  - Density: 57.28/km^{2} (148.4/sq mi)
- Time zone: UTC+01:00 (CET)
  - Summer (DST): UTC+02:00 (CEST)
- Postal codes: 86564
- Dialling codes: 08454
- Vehicle registration: ND, SOB
- Website: www.gemeindebrunnen.de

Brunnen (German pronunciation: [ˈbʁʊnən]; Central Bavarian: Brunna) is a municipality in the district of Neuburg-Schrobenhausen in Bavaria in Germany.
