= Johannes Huber =

German politician

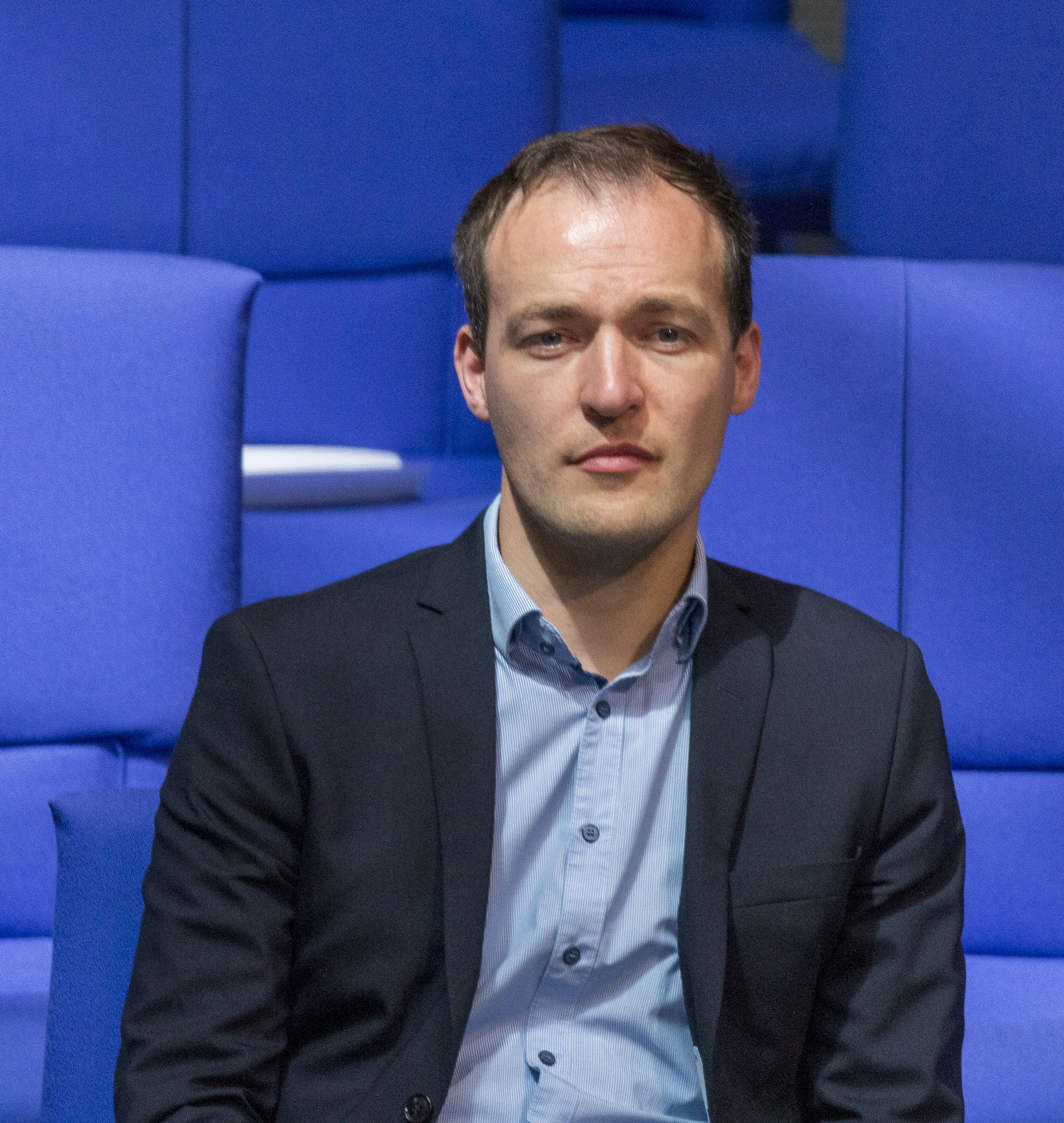
- Huber in 2020

Member of the Bundestag
- Incumbent
- Assumed office 24 October 2017

Personal details
- Born: 12 January 1987 (age 39)
- Party: AfD

Johannes Huber (born 12 January 1987 in Moosburg an der Isar) is a German politician and, since 2017, a member of the Bundestag.

== Life and politics ==
Huber was born 1987 in the West German town of Moosburg and studied sociology at the Catholic University of Eichstätt-Ingolstadt.

Huber entered the AfD in 2014 and became, after the 2017 German federal election, a member of the Bundestag. In December 2021 Huber left the AfD and its parliamentary group.

== Political positions ==
At the end of November 2021, Johannes Huber wrote instructions in a closed Telegram group on how to achieve a false positive test result in a PCR test for a COVID-19 infection. After two weeks of quarantine, one could have achieved the status of a recovered person and, despite the lack of a vaccination, would not be subject to the access restrictions imposed by the 2G rule. When his statements became public, he wrote that his instructions were obviously useless and "obviously not serious".
