= Moosburg an der Isar =

- Town
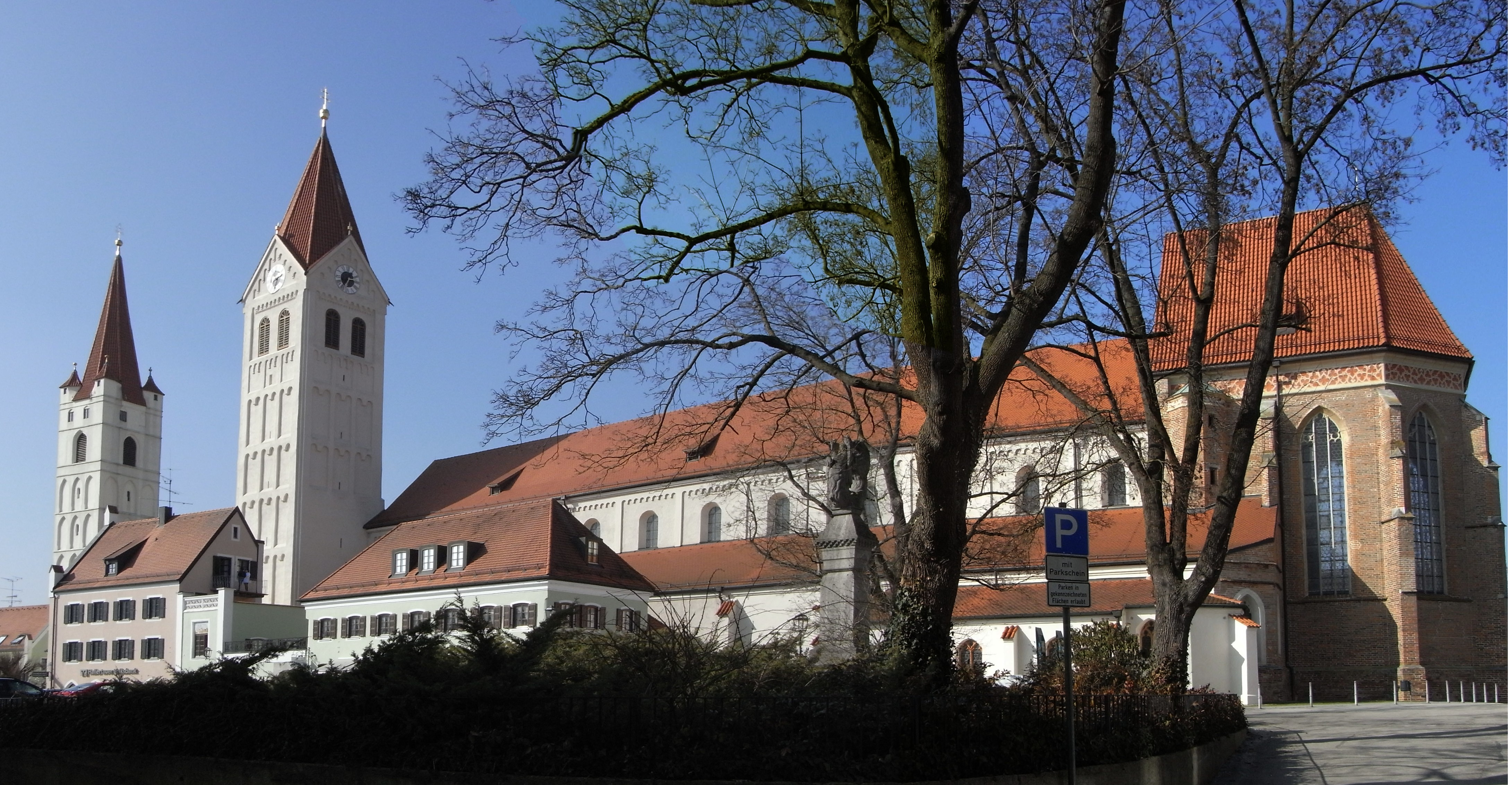
- Churches of Saint John and Saint Castulus

- Coat of arms

- Location of Moosburg an der Isar within Freising district
- Interactive map of Moosburg an der Isar
- Location within Germany Location within Bavaria
- Coordinates: 48°28′N 11°56′E
- Country: Germany
- State: Bavaria
- Admin. region: Oberbayern
- District: Freising

Government
  - Mayor (2020–26): Josef Dollinger

Area
  - Total: 43.85 km^{2} (16.93 sq mi)
- Elevation: 421 m (1,381 ft)

Population (2025-12-31)
  - Total: 20,107
  - Density: 458.5/km^{2} (1,188/sq mi)
- Time zone: UTC+01:00 (CET)
  - Summer (DST): UTC+02:00 (CEST)
- Postal codes: 85360–85368
- Dialling codes: 08761
- Vehicle registration: FS
- Website: www.moosburg.de

Moosburg an der Isar (German pronunciation: [ˈmoːsbʊʁk ʔan deːɐ̯ ˈʔiːzaʁ], lit. 'Moosburg on the Isar'; Central Bavarian: Mooschbuag on da Isa) is a town in the Landkreis Freising of Bavaria, Germany.

The oldest town between Regensburg and Italy lies on the river Isar at an altitude of 421 m (1381 ft). It has 20,237 inhabitants (2022) and covers an area of 44 km^{2}. It is easily reached by the A 92 autobahn and regional trains on the Munich–Regensburg line. Furthermore, it takes just 20 minutes to get to Munich Airport.

Moosburg is popular with commuters who travel to Munich, Freising, and Munich Airport. There is a considerable industry in the town consisting of chemical, electro-technical, food processing, and machine-building plants.

== History ==
There was a Benedictine abbey in Moosburg in the 8th century: a cluster of dwellings and artisans sprang up around it. Duke Heinrich der Löwe started the construction of the Kastulus Minster (cathedral) in 1171, dedicated to Saint Castulus – whose supposed relics were brought to the city. In the 12th century, a town was established and received its first charter in 1311. The walls and moat were completed in the 15th century. The town reached its peak during the early part of the 16th century. In 1599, the Benedictines moved to Landshut, reducing Moosburg's importance.

Sieges and plundering during the Thirty Year War started the decline of the town. In 1702, a fire reduced half the buildings to ashes. Moosburg suffered further depredation during the War of the Austrian Succession and the Napoleonic Wars. Another disastrous fire in 1865 resulted in the downtown area being redeveloped in the style of the late 19th century.

During the 1920s and 1930s, new industries revived the town. In September 1939, a prisoner of war camp Stalag VII-A was built to accommodate 10,000. By early 1945, the number of registered prisoners had grown to more than 70,000—including many in associated labor camps. The presence of this camp close to the town center likely spared it from large-scale bombing.

After the liberation of the camp by the Americans at the end of April 1945, it was turned into Civilian Internment Camp #6 for 12,000 German men and women suspected of criminal activity for the Nazi regime. From 1948, the camp served to house German refugees exiled from Eastern Europe. It became a new part of the town, named Moosburg-Neustadt.

== Main sights and culture ==
The main altar of the Kastulus Minster is the principal masterpiece of the wood sculptor Hans Leinberger of Landshut. Originally, the altar was a triptych in which the side panels could be swiveled inward to close the altar. Today, the side panels hang above the choir stalls.

The Romanesque-style west doorway of the Minster was built in the 19th century.

The Baroque facades that survived the 1865 fire can be seen at the east end of Herrnstrasse, for instance, the red front of the chemist's shop.

The memorial to inmates of Stalag VII-A is a fountain in the center of Neustadt. It consists of four bas-reliefs created out of local stone by the French sculptor Antoniucci Volti while he was a prisoner in the camp.

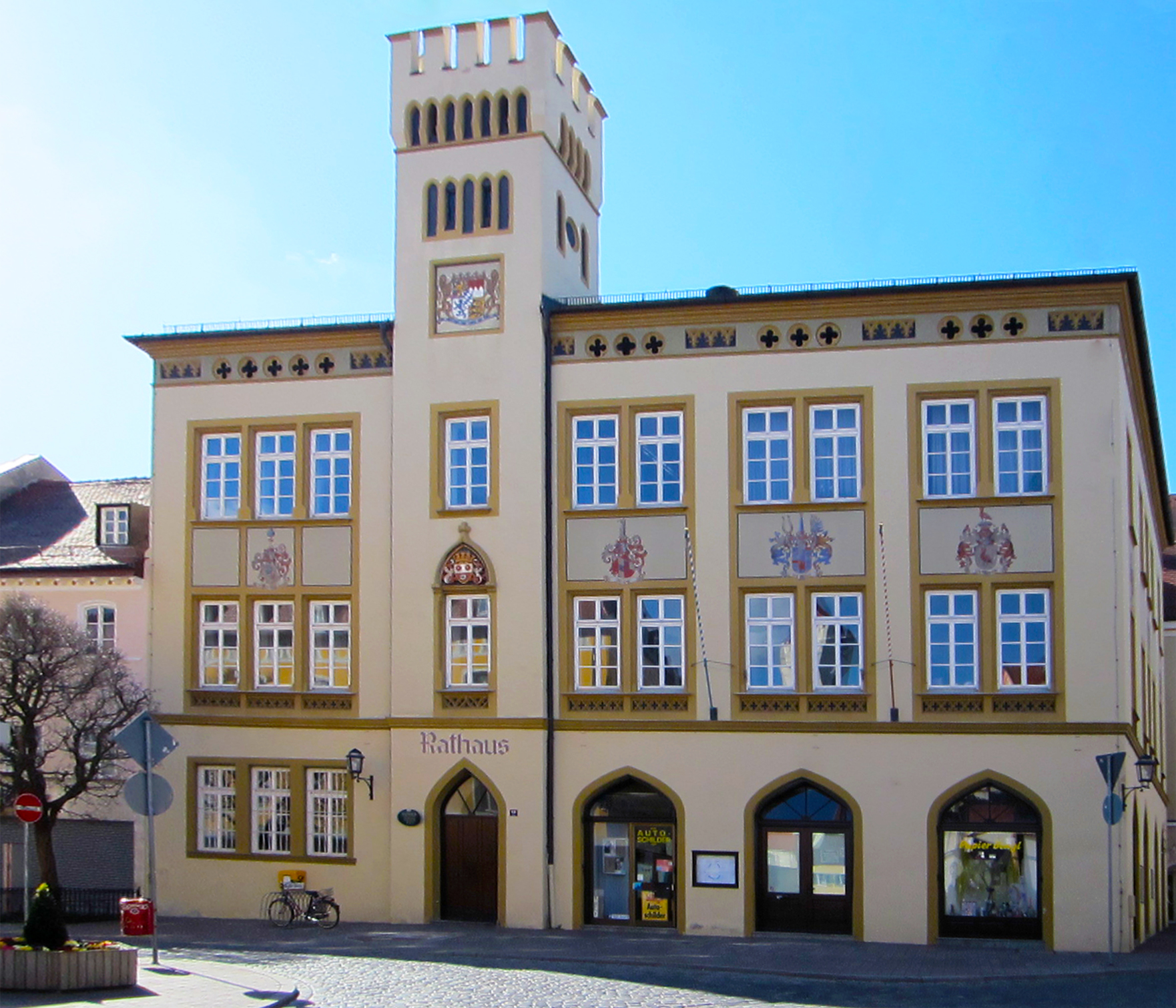
The town hall of Moosburg an der Isar

== People ==
- 1361: Berthold of Moosburg, German Dominican monk
- 1934: Franz Dietl, German Roman-Catholic bishop
- 1956: Hans Neumayer, German racing cyclist
- 1958: Martin Zirnbauer, German physicist
- 1962: Gerhard Wiesheu, German banker
- 1964: Matthias Schranner, German police officer and writer
- 1973: Birgit Rockmeier, German sprinter
- 1973: Gabi Rockmeier, German sprinter
- 1987: Johannes Huber, German politician (AfD)
- 1988: Konrad Baur, German politician (CSU)
- 1991: Andreas Mehltretter, German politician (SPD)
- 1994: Stefan Haas, German football player

== Partner cities ==
- Bry-sur-Marne, (France)
- Moosburg, (Austria)
- (United States) Rochester, Minnesota, (USA)
- (United Kingdom) Sawbridgeworth, Hertfordshire, (UK)
