= Waidhofen, Bavaria =

Waidhofen
- Municipality
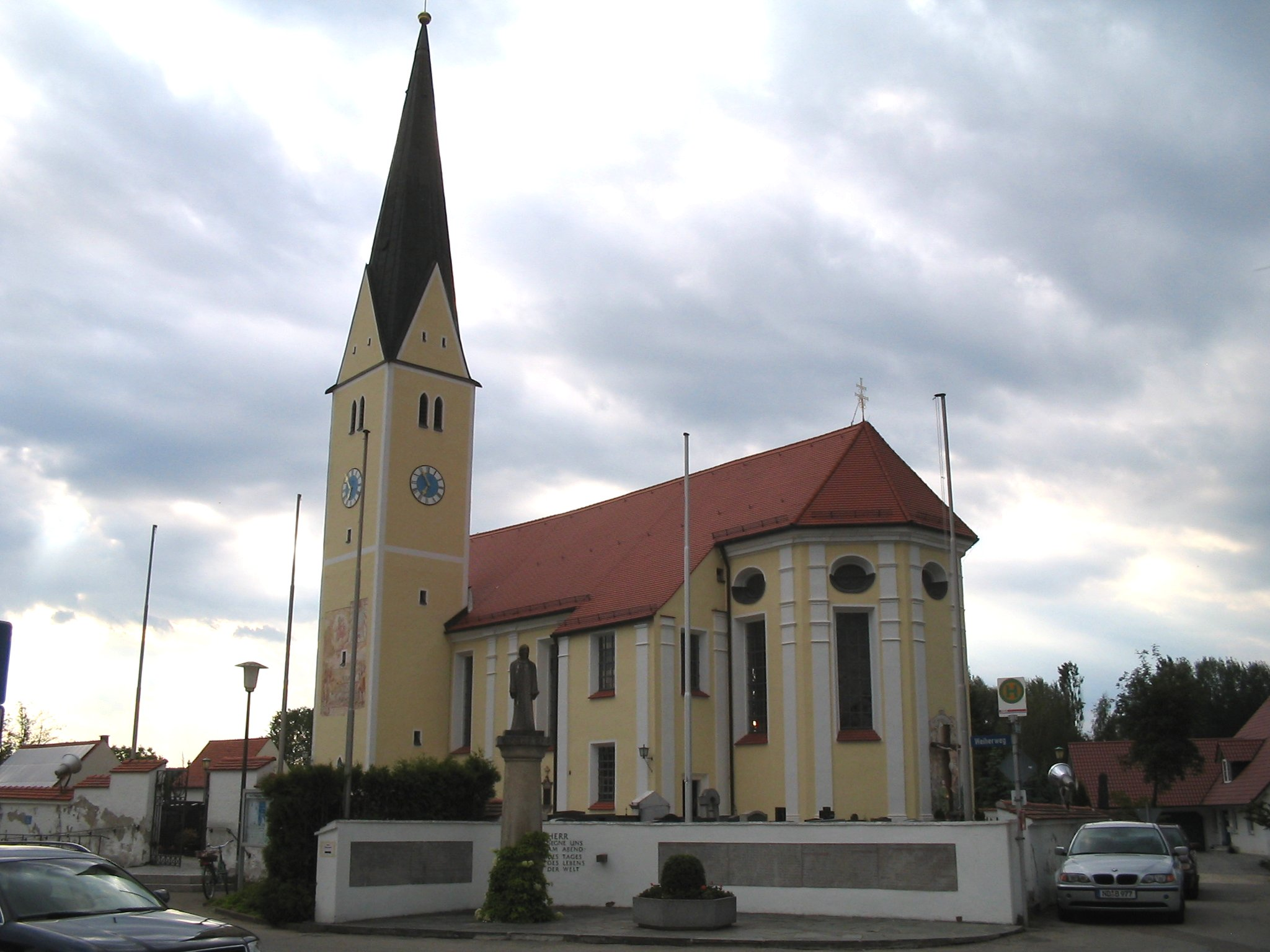
- Roman Catholic parish church

- Coat of arms

- Location of Waidhofen within Neuburg-Schrobenhausen district
- Interactive map of Waidhofen
- Location within Germany Location within Bavaria
- Coordinates: 48°34′45″N 11°20′20″E
- Country: Germany
- State: Bavaria
- Admin. region: Oberbayern
- District: Neuburg-Schrobenhausen
- Municipal assoc.: Schrobenhausen
- Subdivisions: 17 Gemeindeteile

Government
  - Mayor (2020–26): Josef Fuchs

Area
  - Total: 27.32 km^{2} (10.55 sq mi)
- Elevation: 404 m (1,325 ft)

Population (2025-12-31)
  - Total: 2,317
  - Density: 84.81/km^{2} (219.7/sq mi)
- Time zone: UTC+01:00 (CET)
  - Summer (DST): UTC+02:00 (CEST)
- Postal codes: 86579
- Dialling codes: 08443
- Vehicle registration: ND
- Website: www.waidhofen.de

Waidhofen (German pronunciation: [vaɪtˈhoːfn̩]) is a municipality in the district of Neuburg-Schrobenhausen in Bavaria in Germany.

The former farmstead Hinterkaifeck, site of six murders in 1922, falls within this municipality and within the formerly existing municipality of Wangen.
