= Berg im Gau =

- Municipality
- Coat of arms

- Location of Berg im Gau within Neuburg-Schrobenhausen district
- Interactive map of Berg im Gau
- Location within Germany Location within Bavaria
- Coordinates: 48°38′N 11°15′E
- Country: Germany
- State: Bavaria
- Admin. region: Oberbayern
- District: Neuburg-Schrobenhausen
- Municipal assoc.: Schrobenhausen

Government
  - Mayor (2020–26): Helmut Roßkopf

Area
  - Total: 22.59 km^{2} (8.72 sq mi)
- Elevation: 410 m (1,350 ft)

Population (2025-12-31)
  - Total: 1,401
  - Density: 62.02/km^{2} (160.6/sq mi)
- Time zone: UTC+01:00 (CET)
  - Summer (DST): UTC+02:00 (CEST)
- Postal codes: 86562
- Dialling codes: 08433 / 08454
- Vehicle registration: ND
- Website: http://www.berg-im-gau.de

Berg im Gau (German pronunciation: [ˈbɛʁk ʔɪm ˈɡaʊ]) is a municipality in the district of Neuburg-Schrobenhausen in Bavaria in Germany.
