= Gachenbach =

- Municipality
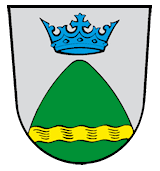
- Coat of arms

- Location of Gachenbach within Neuburg-Schrobenhausen district
- Interactive map of Gachenbach
- Location within Germany Location within Bavaria
- Coordinates: 48°30′N 11°14′E
- Country: Germany
- State: Bavaria
- Admin. region: Oberbayern
- District: Neuburg-Schrobenhausen
- Municipal assoc.: Schrobenhausen

Government
  - Mayor (2020–26): Alfred Lengler (CSU)

Area
  - Total: 30.25 km^{2} (11.68 sq mi)
- Elevation: 452 m (1,483 ft)

Population (2025-12-31)
  - Total: 2,624
  - Density: 86.74/km^{2} (224.7/sq mi)
- Time zone: UTC+01:00 (CET)
  - Summer (DST): UTC+02:00 (CEST)
- Postal codes: 86565
- Dialling codes: 08259
- Vehicle registration: ND

Gachenbach (German pronunciation: [ˈɡaxn̩bax]) is a municipality in the district of Neuburg-Schrobenhausen in Bavaria in Germany.
