= Aresing =

- Municipality
- Coat of arms

- Location of Aresing within Neuburg-Schrobenhausen district
- Interactive map of Aresing
- Location within Germany Location within Bavaria
- Coordinates: 48°32′N 11°18′E
- Country: Germany
- State: Bavaria
- Admin. region: Oberbayern
- District: Neuburg-Schrobenhausen

Government
  - Mayor (2020–26): Klaus Angermeier (CSU)

Area
  - Total: 29.89 km^{2} (11.54 sq mi)
- Elevation: 426 m (1,398 ft)

Population (2025-12-31)
  - Total: 3,099
  - Density: 103.7/km^{2} (268.5/sq mi)
- Time zone: UTC+01:00 (CET)
  - Summer (DST): UTC+02:00 (CEST)
- Postal codes: 86561
- Dialling codes: 08252
- Vehicle registration: ND
- Website: www.aresing.de

Aresing is a municipality in the district of Neuburg-Schrobenhausen in Bavaria in Germany.
