= Deutscher Krimi Preis =

The Deutscher Krimi Preis (today's German spelling: Deutscher Krimipreis), or the German Crime Fiction Award, is the oldest and most prestigious German literary prize for crime fiction.

It has been awarded since 1985 by the Bochum Crime Archive. Unlike the Friedrich Glauser Award, which is awarded by the authors' group The Syndicate, the judges are literary scholars, critics and booksellers. By their own definition, they appreciate the literary skill and original content that give the genre a new impetus. The best new releases of German crime fiction are awarded prizes numbered 1 through 3. In a second category, there are also three awards for newly translated works by international authors.

From its inception, it was decided to not hold a public award ceremony for the winners. However, in 2003, the award was presented publicly as part of the Munich Crime Festival for the first time. In 2004, a public ceremony was held on the occasion of the festival Murder on the Hellweg in Unna. In the subsequent years there was a return to the initial procedure of not holding a public ceremony; instead, the winners were made known only via an announcement.

== Winners ==
The most successful writers in the national category are the Swiss author Peter Zeindler, who won the Award four times between 1986 and 1992 (each time receiving the first place award), and the German author Friedrich Ani, who won five times between 2002 and 2013 (the 1st place once, and the 2nd place four times). In the international category, the late American writer Ross Thomas won the prize (each time in 1st place) four times between 1986 and 1996.

In the table below, the names of the original or translated English titles are given in brackets.

Year	National	International
1985	1. Helga Riedel – Einer muß tot & Wiedergänger; 2. Werner Waldhoff – Des einen oder des anderen Glück & Ausbruch; 3. Frieder Faist – Schattenspiele	1. Alan Furst – Tödliche Karibik & Geschäfte im Schatten (The Caribbean Account & The Shadow Trade); 2. Anthony Price – Ein Spiel für Profis & Die Chandos-Falle (War Game & The Forty-Four Vintage); 3. Thomas Perry – Abrechnung in Las Vegas (The Butcher's Boy)
1986	1. Peter Zeindler – Der Zirkel; 2. Peter Schmidt – Erfindergeist; 3. Norbert Klugmann & Peter Mathews – Flieg, Adler Kühn & Ein Kommissar für alle Fälle	1. Ross Thomas – Mördermission (Missionary Stew); 2. Len Deighton – Mexico Poker (Mexico Set); 3. Manuel Vazquez Montalban – Carvalho und der Mord im Zentralkomitee (Murder in the Central Committee)
1987	1. Horst Bieber – Sein letzter Fehler; 1. Peter Schmidt – Die Stunde des Geschichtenerzählers; 2. Frank Göhre – Der Schrei des Schmetterlings; 3. Michael Molsner – Die Euro-Ermittler – Der ermordete Engel	1. Ross Thomas – Schutzwall (Briar Patch); 2. Len Deighton – London Match; 3. John Le Carré – Ein blendender Spion (A Perfect Spy)
1988	1. Peter Zeindler – Widerspiel; 2. Hans Werner Kettenbach – Schmatz oder Die Sackgasse; 3. Michael Molsner – Unternehmen Counterforce	1. Joseph Wambaugh – Der Rolls-Royce-Tote (The Secrets of Harry Bright); 2. Ruth Rendell – Herzsplitter & In blinder Panik (Heartstones & Live Flesh); 3. Stanley R. Lee – Dunn's Dilemma (Dunn's Conundrum)
1989	1. Detlef Bernd Blettenberg – Farang; 2. Michael Molsner – Die Ehre einer Offiziersfrau & Eu-ro-Ermittler: Urians Spur; 3. Willi Voss – Das Gesetz des Dschungels	1. James Ellroy – Die schwarze Dahlie (Black Dahlia); 2. Manuel Vazquez Montalban – Manche gehen baden 3. Julian Rathbone – Grünfinger (Zdt); 3. Andrew Vachss – Kata (Flood)
1990	1. Peter Zeindler – Der Schattenagent; 2. Yaak Karsunke – Toter Mann; 3. Gisbert Haefs – Schattenschneise	1. Ross Thomas – Am Rand der Welt (Out on the Rim); 2. James Ellroy – Blutschatten & Stiller Schrecken (The Big Nowhere & Silent Terror); 3. Robert Wright Campbell – Glitzerland (In La-La-Land We Trust)
1991	1. Pieke Biermann – Violetta; 2. Peter Schmidt – Das Veteranentreffen; 3. Kurt Bracharz – Höllenengel	1. Derek Raymond – Ich war Dora Suarez (I Was Dora Suarez); 2. Manuel Vazquez Montalban – Schuss aus dem Hinterhalt (Offside); 3. Carl Hiaasen – Unter die Haut (Skin Tight)
1992	1. Peter Zeindler – Feuerprobe; 2. Jakob Arjouni – Ein Mann, ein Mord (One Man, One Murder); 3. Uta-Maria Heim – Das Rattenprinzip	1. James Ellroy – Stadt der Teufel (L.A. Confidential); 2. Tom Kakonis – Abgezockt (Double Down); 3. David L. Lindsey – Abgründig (Mercy)
1993	1. Bernhard Schlink – Selbs Betrug; 2. Martin Grzimek – Feuerfalter; 3. Leo P. Ard & Michael Illner – Gemischtes Doppel	1. Andreu Martin – Bis daß der Mord euch scheidet 2. Batya Gur – Denn am Sabbat sollst du ruhen 3. Jerome Charyn – Paradise Man
1994	1. Pieke Biermann – Herzrasen; 2. Uta-Maria Heim – Die Kakerlakenstadt; 3. Jürgen Alberts – Tod eines Sesselfurzers	1. Carl Hiaasen – Grosse Tiere (Native Tongue); 2. Michael Dibdin – Schmutzige Tricks (Dirty Tricks); 3. John le Carré – Der Nachtmanager (The Night Manager)
1995	1. Detlef Bernd Blettenberg – Blauer Rum; 2. Sabine Deitmer – Dominante Damen; 3. Gunter Gerlach – Kortison	1. Philip Kerr – Das Wittgenstein-Programm (A Philosophical Investigation); 2. Peter Hoeg – Fräulein Smillas Gespür für Schnee (Miss Smilla's Feeling for Snow); 3. James Lee Burke – Weisses Leuchten (A Stained White Radiance)
1996	1. Robert Hültner – Inspektor Kajetan und die Sache Koslowski; 2. Robert Brack – Das Gangsterbüro; 3. Regula Venske – Rent a Russian	1. Ross Thomas – Die im Dunkeln (Ah, Treachery); 2. Schulamit Lapid – Lokalausgabe; 3. William Marshall – Die Ehre der Kämpfer (War Machine)
1997	1. Alexander Heimann – Dezemberföhn; 2. Gisbert Haefs – Das Kichern des Generals; 3. Wolf Haas – Auferstehung der Toten	1. Philip Kerr – Game Over (Gridiron); 2. James Ellroy – Ein amerikanischer Thriller (American Tabloid); 3. Donna Leon – Venezianische Scharade (The Anonymous Venetian)
1998	1. Robert Hültner – Die Godin; 2. Pieke Biermann – Vier, fünf, sechs 3. John Cassar – Bogarts Bruder; 3. Roger Fiedler – Sushi, Ski und schwarze Sheriffs	1. Patricia Melo – O Matador; 2. Kenneth Abel – Köder am Haken (Bait); 3. James Ellroy – Die Rothaarige (My Dark Places)
1999	1. Wolf Haas – Komm, süßer Tod; 2. Jörg Juretzka – Prickel; 3. Kurt Lanthaler – Azzurro	1. Jerry Oster – Sturz ins Dunkel (Nightfall); 2. Henning Mankell – Die fünfte Frau (The Fifth Woman); 3. Elmore Leonard – Out of Sight
2000	1. Thea Dorn – Die Hirnkönigin; 2. Wolf Haas – Silentium!; 3. Wolfram Fleischhauer – Die Frau mit den Regenhänden	1. Garry Disher – Gier (Kickback); 2. George P. Pelecanos – Das grosse Umlegen (The Big Blowdown); 3. Michael Connelly – Das zweite Herz (Blood Work)
2001	1. Ulrich Ritzel – Schwemmholz; 2. Anne Chaplet – Nichts als die Wahrheit; 3. Sam Jaun – Fliegender Sommer	1. Jean-Claude Izzo – Chourmo; 2. Michael Connelly – Schwarze Engel (Angels Flight); 3. Henning Mankell – Mittsommermord (One Step Behind); 3. Dennis Lehane – Kein Kinderspiel (Gone, Baby, Gone)
2002	1. Alexander Heimann – Muttertag; 2. Friedrich Ani – Süden und das Gelöbnis des gefallenen Engels; 3. Jörg Juretzka – Der Willy ist weg	1. Garry Disher – Drachenmann (The Dragon Man); 2. Yasmina Khadra – Herbst der Chimären (Autumn of the Phantoms); 3. Dennis Lehane – Regenzauber (Prayers for Rain)
2003	1. Friedrich Ani – Süden und der Straßenbahntrinker; 2. Martin Suter – Ein perfekter Freund; 3. Richard Birkefeld & Göran Hachmeister – Wer übrig bleibt, hat recht	1. Robert Wilson – Tod in Lissabon (A Small Death in Lisboa); 2. Ian Rankin – Puppenspiel & Verschlüsselte Wahrheit (The Falls & The Black Book); 3. Dennis Lehane – Spur der Wölfe (Mystic River)
2004	1. Detlef Bernd Blettenberg – Berlin, Fidschitown; 2. Anne Chaplet – Schneesterben; 3. Heinrich Steinfest – Ein sturer Hund	1. Fred Vargas – Fliehe weit und schnell (Have Mercy on Us All); 2. George P. Pelecanos – Schuss ins Schwarze & Eine süße Ewigkeit (The Sweet Forever & Right as Rain); 3. Christopher G. Moore – Stunde null in Phnom Penh (Cut Out)
2005	1. Astrid Paprotta – Die ungeschminkte Wahrheit; 2. Frank Schätzing – Der Schwarm (The Swarm); 3. Oliver Bottini – Mord im Zeichen des Zen	1. Ian Rankin – Die Kinder des Todes (A Question of Blood); 2. Arne Dahl – Falsche Opfer; 3. Petros Markaris – Live
2006	1. Norbert Horst – Todesmuster; 2. Heinrich Steinfest – Der Umfang der Hölle; 3. Wolfgang Schorlau – Das dunkle Schweigen	1. David Peace – 1974 (Nineteen Seventy Four); 2. Deon Meyer – Das Herz des Jägers (Heart of the Hunter); 3. Arne Dahl – Tiefer Schmerz
2007	1. Andrea Maria Schenkel – Tannöd (The Murder Farm); 2. Paulus Hochgatterer – Die Süße des Lebens (The Sweetness of Life); 3. Oliver Bottini – Im Sommer der Mörder	1. Robert Littell – Die kalte Legende (Legends); 2. Pete Dexter – Train; 3. Leonardo Padura – Adiós Hemingway
2008	1. Andrea Maria Schenkel – Kalteis; 2. Heinrich Steinfest – Die feine Nase der Lilli Steinbeck; 3. Jan Costin Wagner – Das Schweigen (Silence)	1. James Sallis – Driver (Drive); 2. Martin Cruz Smith – Stalins Geist (Stalin's Ghost); 3. Matti Rönkä – Der Grenzgänger
2009	1. Linus Reichlin – Die Sehnsucht der Atome; 2. Bernhard Jaumann – Die Augen der Medusa; 3. Heinrich Steinfest – Mariaschwarz	1. Richard Stark – Fragen Sie den Papagei (Ask the Parrot); 2. Jerome Charyn – Citizen Sidel (Citizen Sidel); 3. Deon Meyer – Weißer Schatten (Blood Safari)
2010	1. Ulrich Ritzel – Beifang; 2. Friedrich Ani – Totsein verjährt nicht 3. Jörg Juretzka – Alles total groovy hier	1. David Peace – Tokio im Jahr Null (Tokyo Year Zero); 2. Roger Smith – Kap der Finsternis (Mixed Blood); 3. Ken Bruen – Jack Taylor fliegt raus (The Guards)
2011	1. Bernhard Jaumann – Die Stunde des Schakals; 2. Frank Göhre – Der Auserwählte; 3. D.B. Blettenberg – Murnaus Vermächtnis	1. Don Winslow – Tage der Toten (The Power of the Dog); 2. Josh Bazell – Schneller als der Tod (Beat the Reaper); 3. Dominique Manotti – Letzte Schicht (Lorraine Connection)
2012	1. Mechtild Borrmann – Wer das Schweigen bricht 2. Friedrich Ani – Süden; 3. Elisabeth Herrmann – Zeugin der Toten	1. Peter Temple – Wahrheit (Truth); 2. Don Winslow – Zeit des Zorns (Savages); 3. Kate Atkinson – Das vergessene Kind (Started Early, Took My Dog)
2013	1. Merle Kröger – Grenzfall; 2. Friedrich Ani – Süden und das heimliche Leben; 3. Oliver Bottini – Der kalte Traum	1. Sara Gran – Die Stadt der Toten (The City of the Dead); 2. Helon Habila – Öl auf Wasser (Oil on Water); 3. Donald Ray Pollock – Das Handwerk des Teufels (The Devil all the Time)
2014	1. Friedrich Ani – M 2. Robert Hültner – Am Ende des Tages; 3. Matthias Wittekindt – Marmormänner	1. Patrícia Melo – Leichendieb; 2. John le Carré – Empfindliche Wahrheit (A Delicate Truth); 3. Jerome Charyn – Unter dem Auge Gottes (Under the Eye of God)
2015	1. Franz Dobler - Ein Bulle im Zug; 2. Oliver Botin - Ein paar Tage Licht; 3. Max Annas - Die Farm	1. James Lee Burke - Regengötter (Rain Gods); 2. Liza Cody - Lady Bag; 3. Oliver Harris - London Underground (Deep Shelter)
2016	1. Friedrich Ani - Der namenlose Tag; 2. Merle Kröger - Havarie; 3. Zoë Beck - Schwarzblende	1. Richard Price - Die Unantastbaren (The Whites); 2. Fred Vargas - Das barmherzige Fallbeil (Temps Glaciaires); 3. Sara Gran - Dope
2017	1. Max Annas - Die Mauer; 2. Simone Buchholz - Blaue Nacht; 3. Franz Dobler - Ein Schlag ins Gesicht	1. Donald Ray Pollock - Die himmlische Tafel (The Heavenly Table); 2. Liza Cody - Miss Terry; 3. Garry Disher - Bitter Wash Road
2018	1. Oliver Bottini - Der Tod in den stillen Winkeln des Lebens; 2. Monika Geier - Alles so hell da vorn 3. Andreas Pflüger - Niemals	1. John le Carré - Das Vermächtnis der Spione (A Legacy of Spies); 2 Viet Thanh Nguyen - Der Sympathisant (The Sympathizer); 3. Jérôme Leroy - Der Block (Le Bloc)
2019	1. Simone Buchholz - Mexikoring; 2. Matthias Wittekindt - Die Tankstelle von Courcelles; 3. Max Annas - Finsterwalde	1. Hideo Yokoyama - 64; 2. Tom Franklin - Krumme Type, krumme Type; 3. Denise Mina - Blut Salz Wasser
2019	1. Johannes Groschupf - Berlin Prepper; 2. Regina Nössler - Die Putzhilfe; 3. Max Annas - Morduntersuchungskommission	1. Hannelore Cayre - Die Alte; 2. Dror Mishani - Drei; 3. Denise Mina - Klare Sache
2020	1. Zoë Beck - Paradise City; 2. Max Annas - Morduntersuchungskommission. Der Fall Melchior Nikoleit; 3. Frank Göhre - Verdammte Liebe Amsterdam	1. Denise Mina - Götter und Tiere; 2. Garry Disher - Hope Hill Drive; 3. Young-ha Kim - Aufzeichnungen eines Serienmörders
