= Pieke Biermann =

German crime writer (born 1950)

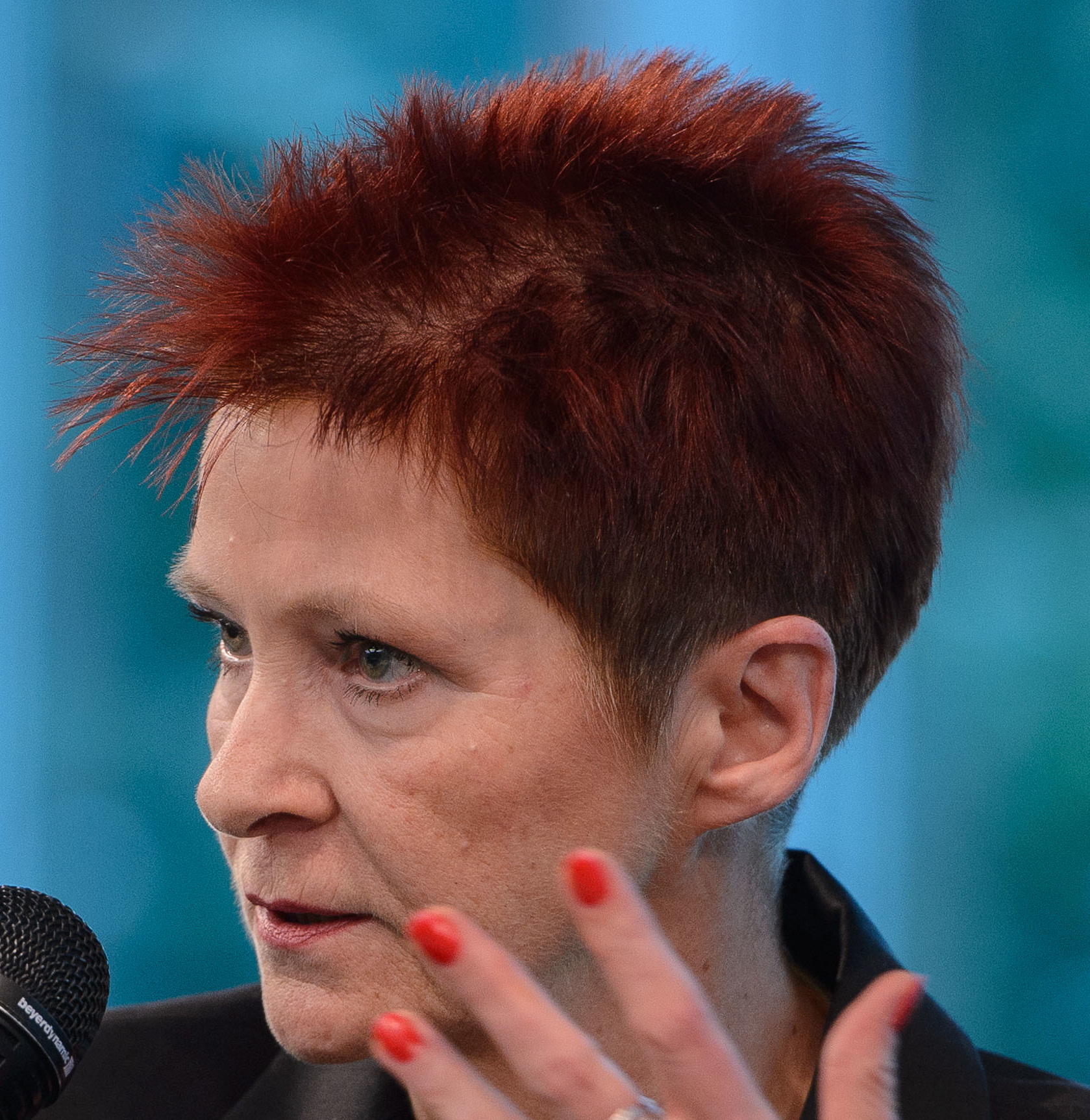
Pieke Biermann in 2014

Pieke Biermann (born 22 March 1950, in Stolzenau as Lieselotte Hanna Eva Biermann) is a German crime writer, literary translator and journalist. She is the winner of the 2020 Leipzig Book Fair Translator's Prize. In the 1970s and '80s, she was an activist in the Berlin women's movement.

== Life and work ==
'Pieke' Biermann is her registered pseudonym. She lived in Hanover from 1955, where she graduated from Helene-Lange-Schule. She began studying German literature and language with Hans Mayer as well as English studies and political science at the University of Hanover in 1968. In 1973/'74 she spent a year studying at the University of Padua and began her first translation work. She completed her studies in 1976 at the TU Hannover with a master's thesis on the subject of unpaid housework. She then received a graduate scholarship for a dissertation, which she did not finish.

She has lived in Berlin since 1976 and works as a freelance translator of English, American and Italian literature into German. She has translated Dacia Maraini, Dorothy Parker, Tom Rachman and others. She has produced new translations of several Agatha Christie novels, such as Death on the Nile and Das Eulenhaus. Biermann was honoured with the 2020 Leipzig Book Fair Prize for his translation of Oreo, the only novel by African-American writer Fran Ross to take its particular tone from Yiddish. The literary critic Antje Rávik Strubel praised it as a "magnificent achievement" by the translator, "that the countless language games, onomatopoeias and richness of word invention are transferred into German and that the linguistic pleasure and great humour of the text are conveyed".

From 1976 onwards, Pieke Biermann was an activist in the Berlin women's movement and was considered a "front woman" of the West German Prostitute movement in the 1980s. Together with Gisela Bock and Barbara Duden, among others, she founded the "Lohn für Hausarbeit" group at the Frauenzentrum Westberlin, which was based on an international feminist movement that emerged in the US in the early 1970s. The group argued that not only housework, but also prostitution was wage labour like any other and that sex work was a way for women in patriarchy to achieve independence. With this approach, Biermann, who herself worked as a sex worker for a time, initiated a prostitute campaign. Her book "Wir sind Frauen wie andere auch!" Prostitutes and their struggles polarised the women's movement. It was republished in 2014, supplemented with five speeches and essays by Pieke Biermann from 1980 to 2007. Biermann was a co-founder and board member of the Berlin prostitutes' organisation Hydra and was one of the initiators of the first German "Prostitutes' Ball", which took place on 6 February 1988 at the International Congress Centrum Berlin.

She became known as a writer with crime fiction. Her debut novel was published in 1987 and she has won the Deutscher Krimi Preis three times. Biermann developed her crime stories as private stories against the backdrop of Berlin and created a panorama of ways of life. Modelled on the Expressionist metropolitan novel.

What Los Angeles was for Raymond Chandler or Amsterdam for Janwillem van de Wetering, Berlin is for me – the unknown metropolis of the Western world: a city that seems to be made up of myths. I want to tell the story of Berlin in novels that tell facts.

— Pieke Biermann

Her series of four Berlin novels featuring the detective "Karin Lietze" begins in the Cold War with Potsdamer Ableben. The last novel in the series, Four, Five, Six (the title alludes to Billy Wilder's 1961 comedy One, Two, Three), deals with the "Berlin plagued by unification problems". Murder is a minor matter. Biermann takes a topographical route through the city to "bring the criminal case, contemporary history, the problems of reunification, the dynamics of the big city and the fate of life under the hat of a socio-critical entertainment novel", according to the reviewer Thomas Medicus. He criticised the "egalitarian scene jargon" that pervades the novel. Florian Felix Weyh read the language of her crime short stories Berlin, Kabbala, which appeared in the same year, differently. He felt atmospherically reminded of Döblin's Berlin Alexanderplatz. The noise of the big city lays itself as an acoustic pattern over and under Biermann's texts. "The reader must be able to hear, sometimes even join in, in order to make sense of dialects and sociolects."

As a journalist, Pieke Biermann wrote court and literary crime reports for print media and radio, political feuilletons and literary criticism. She was an author for Tagesspiegel and Deutschlandfunk Kultur, among others. In 2002, the Jüdische Allgemeine commissioned her to comment on Jewish life from a non-Jewish perspective. Her column appeared for over a year and a half under the title Gojisch gesehen. The collected texts were published as a book in 2004.

== Awards ==
- 1990: 3sat-Auszeichnung beim Ingeborg-Bachmann-Preis for Das Gesetz des Auges
- 1991: Deutscher Krimi Preis (National 1) for Violetta
- 1994: Deutscher Krimi Preis (National 1) for Herzrasen
- 1998: Deutscher Krimi Preis (National 2) for Vier, Fünf, Sechs
- 2009: Journalisten-Preis des Weißen Rings, Sonderpreis for Kriminalreportagen in Tagesspiegel and RBB Inforadio
- 2020: Preis der Leipziger Buchmesse for the translation of the novel Oreo by Fran Ross from the American English

== Works ==
- Wir sind Frauen wie andere auch! – Prostituierte und ihre Kämpfe. Politisches Sachbuch, Rowohlt Verlag, 1979. Erweiterte Neuauflage im Argument Verlag, Hamburg 2014, ISBN 978-3-86754-500-6.
- Potsdamer Ableben. Kriminalroman, Rotbuch Verlag, Berlin 1987, ISBN 3-442-44024-6.
- Violetta. Kriminalroman, Rotbuch Verlag, Berlin 1990, ISBN 3-442-44025-4.
- Herzrasen. Kriminalroman, Rotbuch Verlag, Berlin 1993, ISBN 3-442-44026-2.
- Berlin, Kabbala. Short Stories, Transit Buchverlag, Berlin 1997, ISBN 3-442-44344-X.
- Vier, Fünf, Sechs. Kriminalroman, Manhattan by Goldmann, München 1997, ISBN 3-442-44373-3.
- Herta & Doris. Sammlung von Prosatexten, Goldmann, München 2002, ISBN 3-442-45217-1.
- Gojisch gesehen. Feuilletons aus der Jüdischen Allgemeinen, Kranichsteiner Literaturverlag, Pfungstadt 2004, ISBN 3-929265-16-8.
- Der Asphalt unter Berlin. Kriminalreportagen aus der Metropole. Pendragon Verlag, Bielefeld 2008, ISBN 978-3-86532-104-6.

Als Herausgeberin

- Mit Zorn, Charme & Methode. Oder: Die Aufklärung ist weiblich. 13 Kriminalgeschichten, Fischer-Taschenbuch-Verlag, Frankfurt am Main 1992, ISBN 3-596-10839-X.
- Wilde Weiber GmbH. Kriminalgeschichten. Fischer-Taschenbuch-Verlag, Frankfurt am Main 1993, ISBN 3-596-11586-8.

== Translations ==
- Maria Rita Parsi: Abfall. Marco und Maria, zwei Jugendliche aus dem Großstadtghetto erzählen ihre Geschichte. Rowohlt, Reinbek 1979
- Rosetta Froncillo: Confusa Desio. Eine Reise in Abschweifungen. Frauenoffensive, München 1983
- Francesco Alberoni: Erotik. Weibliche Erotik, männliche Erotik, was ist das? Piper, München 1986
- Dacia Maraini: Isolina. Die zerstückelte Frau. Rotbuch, 1988
- Dorothy Parker: Eine starke Blondine. New Yorker Geschichten. Haffmans, 1989
- Franco Lucentini, Carlo Fruttero: Ein Hoch auf die Dummheit. Porträts, Pamphlete, Parodien. Piper, München 1992
- mit Ursula-Maria Mössner: Dorothy Parker, Dämmerung vor dem Feuerwerk. New Yorker Geschichten. Bertelsmann, Rheda-Wiedenbrück; Buchgemeinschaft Donauland, Wien 1998; wieder New Yorker Geschichten. Kein & Aber, 2003 (The portable Dorothy Parker)
- Stefano Benni: Die Bar auf dem Meeresgrund: Unterwassergeschichten. Wagenbach, 1999
- Walter Mosley: Socrates Welt. Büchergilde Gutenberg, Frankfurt 2000
- Stefano Benni: Terra! Wagenbach, 2002
- Liza Cody: Gimme more. Unionsverlag, Zürich 2003
- Agatha Christie: Tod auf dem Nil. Fischer, 2004
- Anya Ulinich: Petropolis: Die große Reise der Mailorder-Braut Sascha Goldberg. dtv, München 2008, ISBN 978-3-423-24684-2
- Andrea Bajani Mit herzlichen Grüßen. Deutscher Taschenbuch Verlag dtv, München 2010
- Tom Rachman: Die Unperfekten. dtv, 2010 ISBN 978-3-423-24821-1
- Agatha Christie: Das Eulenhaus. Fischer TB, 2011 ISBN 978-3-596-51171-6
- Andrea Bajani: Lorenzos Reise. Deutscher Taschenbuch Verlag, München 2011
- Andrea Bajani: Liebe und andere Versprechen. dtv, 2012
- Katherine Boo: Annawadi oder Der Traum von einem anderen Leben. Droemer, 2012 ISBN 978-3-426-27592-4
- Andrea Bajani: Erkennst du mich? dtv, 2013 ISBN 978-3-423-14308-0
- Ben Fountain: Die irre Heldentour des Billy Lynn. dtv, 2013
- Fran Ross: Oreo. Nachwort Max Czollek. dtv, München 2019, ISBN 978-3-423-28197-3
