= Shorter Days =

Novel by Anna Katharina Hahn

Shorter Days (German Kürzere Tage) is a novel by Anna Katharina Hahn, published in 2009 (hardback; paperback 2010) with the German publisher Suhrkamp Verlag. The English translation by Anne Posten appeared in 2016 with Frisch & Co., a publisher of electronic books in English translation.

While the novel focuses, in particular, on the female character Judith Seysollf, it presents the story of three married couples, as well as two individual characters, that live in the same neighborhood in Stuttgart. Judith and Klaus have two boys, and Leonie and Simon have two girls. The third couple are the Posselts, an older couple who never had children and live downstairs in the same apartment building as Judith and Klaus. Two individual characters—Hanna, a single mother of a boy, and Marco, an almost 13 year old, good-looking boy from the neighborhood—disrupt the narrative towards the end in significant ways.

After the publication of two books of short stories in 2000 and 2004, Shorter Days was Hahn's first novel.

== Plot ==
The main plot starts during the time leading up to Halloween, but the reader learns about the previous lives of the protagonists through flashbacks.

After torturous years at the university studying art history, Judith has found a tentative peace with her husband Klaus, and her two sons, Uli and Kilian. Afflicted with crippling self-doubt, her studies left her becoming a chainsmoker and dependent on Tavor, a tranquilizer. Klaus Rapp, a doctoral student in engineering, who had lived in the same building as hers on Stuttgart’s east side, a working class and industrial part of town, often invited Judith and tried to connect with her. He moved out after completing his doctorate, and Judith continued her semi-abusive relationship with a macho medical student named Sören and her slide into ever more severe depression and anxiety.

Parallel to Judith’s story, the novel also tells that of Leonie, the daughter of a well-to-do catholic family from Stuttgart-Heslach. At the end of the Gymnasium, she fell in love with Simon, a tall, good-looking only son of a working class single mother. Simon has left his modest background behind: he is now the sales manager at a company that he already worked for when he was still in training at a vocational academy. The reader meets Leonie and Simon one week before Halloween at a celebration of the spooky holiday at a children’s farm close to her neighborhood called “At the Wrens” where Leonie took her two daughters. Simon and Leonie’s family recently moved into a spacious apartment across from Klaus and Judith’s building. After sundown, Leonie frequently is able to look through the windows of their apartment and admires their wholesome family life. Leonie wishes she could become friends with Judith and Klaus, and her daughters with their sons.

One of the few businesses in their neighborhood is a grocery store run by Nâzım, a Turkish-German. On the afternoon when Leonie went to the children’s farm with Lisa and Feli, Judith and Kilian stop by Nâzım’s store in order to buy ingredients for the pumpkin soup that Judith wants to prepare that night. Nâzım’s nephew Murat entered the store, too, because he started an internship that day which is part of his school’s curriculum. In front of the store, three friends from Murat’s “clique” make fun of him through the window, Ufuk, Hassan, and Marco. Judith takes note of the latter and his handsome looks. The very same evening, Leonie is having a glass of wine after she put her daughters to bed, when suddenly some kids ring her bell for trick-or-treating. She buzzes them in; it is Marco, Murat, Ufuk, and Hassan. Marco flirts with Leonie unabashedly; she engages them a bit but, then, lets them go.

The next morning, Judith notices that the garden downstairs, in front of Posselt's living room, is littered with the remains of firecrackers, and that their window is smeared with mustard, toothpaste, and cracked eggs. This was obviously some adolescent Halloween prank--maybe committed by Marco, Murat, Hassan, and Ufuk? A later chapter, from Luise Posselt's perspective, recounts the incident, as well. Mr. Posselt wanted to take on the juveniles but Luise talked him out of it successfully, something about which he was resentful. Judith cleans up the mess for the Posselts, in order to "reestablish order," as the text says. For the afternoon, she also had a playdate planned for her sons with Mattis, Hanna's child. Hanna never shows.

Before Judith and the boys go up to her family's apartment, Marco and his friends walk by and shout obscene propositions at her and the kids.

This is the moment when Hahn switches the narrative perspective to Marco. In two chapters, the reader learns about his plans to run away, and the preparations for another scheme that is not yet explicitly mentioned in the text. The chapters are interspersed with Marco's past childhood story. We learn that his mother, Anita, was 16 years old when she got pregnant with Marco. He never met his father, Tobi, who ran away when he learned that he was going to be a parent. Later, Anita entered a relationship with Eino a very quiet man from Estonia. Eino took good care of little Marco, taught him a number of things, and shared his plans with him to go back to the coast in Estonia one day. Eino wanted Anita and Marco to come with him. When Marco was nine years old, Eino suddenly left for Estonia; a note with his address indicated that he wanted Anita and Marco to follow him later. Marco's interpretation was that Anita had been to weak to go with him. After a while, she had a new boyfriend, Achim, who cleaned office spaces for a cleaning company. Beginning with the first night when Achim moved in with them unannounced, Marco suffers violent abuse from the new boyfriend, whose appearance and bad taste make Marco give him the nickname "Porno." What Anita does not know: Marco has kept Eino's farewell note hidden under his mattress cover.

Four events converge at the end of the narrative that bring the novel to a turbulent close. After a long-planned birthday party for one of her friends in nearby Tübingen, Leonie is hung over having resisted at the last minute an almost-affair with a married man. Judith witnesses how Hanna’s son Mattis has one of his health breakdowns in their street, and is forced to give them a ride to the children’s hospital. Luise Posselt gets up that same day, not realizing that her husband has died overnight. When she finally recognizes that he has died, she frantically gets him ready for a wake, without notifying anyone else. Finally, a robbery combined with arson at Nâzım’s store shakes Leonie, Judith, and the Posselt’s upscale Stuttgart neighborhood.

== Structure ==
For the structure of her novel, Anna Katharina Hahn relies on a series of chapters written in free indirect discourse from the perspective of multiple characters. Each of the fourteen chapters carries the name of a character in order to indicate the narrative perspective, as follows:

1. Judith
2. Leonie
3. Judith
4. Leonie
5. Judith
6. Leonie
7. Judith
8. Marco
9. Marco
10. Luise
11. Luise
12. Leonie
13. Judith
14. Marco

It is worth pointing out that, during the first half of all chapters, the perspective regularly alternates between that of Judith and Leonie. In the sixth and seventh chapter (6. Leonie, 7. Judith), Marco is more directly introduced through interactions with each Leonie and Judith. Two "Marco" chapters follow that offer extensive flashbacks about his upbringing.

Another detail that will catch the eye of the reader is the structural contrast between Judith and Leonie in regards to motherhood. For Judith, her sons Uli and Kilian are clearly a means for self-affirmation; towards the end of the novel, we see that she has never really left her dysfunctional life on Stuttgart's east side, dependent on tranquilizers, behind. The children are her safety vest that keep Judith from drowning. Of Leonie, we learn that she feels a strong emotional bond to her daughters, and a powerful urge to protect them. At the same time, she feels the obligation to have a career beyond her role as a mother.

The category of gender reveals a structural singularity: the only "masculine" narrative perspective belongs to Marco, an adolescent who has not yet turned 13. All other relationships (Judith/Klaus, Leonie/Simon, Luise/Wenzel) are being presented through the eyes of their female half.

== Characters ==
- Judith Rapp, née Seysollf, a mother of two, former student of Art History, never finished her degree.
- Klaus Rapp, Judith's husband, holds a doctoral degree in Engineering.
- Uli and Kilian, Judith and Klaus' two sons. Judith raises them according to the principles of Anthroposophy and has them attend Waldorf institutions.
- Leonie, also a mother of two, works in the communications department of a bank.
- Simon, Leonie's husband, tall and attractive, office job, leading position.
- Lisa and Felicia, Leonie and Simon's two daughters.
- Luise Posselt, an older lady in Judith and Klaus' apartment building.
- Wenzel Posselt, her husband, of Sudeten German descent.
- Hanna, single mother of Mattis, a 4-year-old boy who is very delicate, often sick and plagued by allergies.
- Marco, son of a single mother (Anita), who is often getting abused by her current boyfriend. At separate points in the novel, both Leonie and Judith comment on his good looks. He is almost 13 years old.
- Sören, Judith's former boyfriend before she moved in with Klaus, studied Medicine in Tübingen, now a doctor at the "Olgahospital," a children's hospital in Stuttgart.

== Reception ==
Overall, Anna Katharina Hahn's debut novel enjoyed a very positive echo in the German press. Most critics lauded the precision of Hahn's observation, and her deconstruction of the affluent, upper middle class facades of some of her protagonists.

Ursula März wrote in the German weekly Die Zeit about how impressed she was by Hahn's representation of the immense psychic and social internal pressures that the protagonists' frantic quests for identity create.

Jürgen Becker, in the German daily Die Tageszeitung (taz), admired Hahn's confident style, as well as the rigorous illumination of the world of her main characters, i.e. Leonie and Judith. Becker does not keep it a secret that he regards the ending of the novel as abrupt which indicates, at the same time, how long the author takes to join her different narrative threads together.

== Awards ==
- Roswitha Prize 2010, awarded by the city of Bad Gandersheim.
- Heimito von Doderer-Literaturpreis 2010.
