= Anna Katharina Hahn =

German author

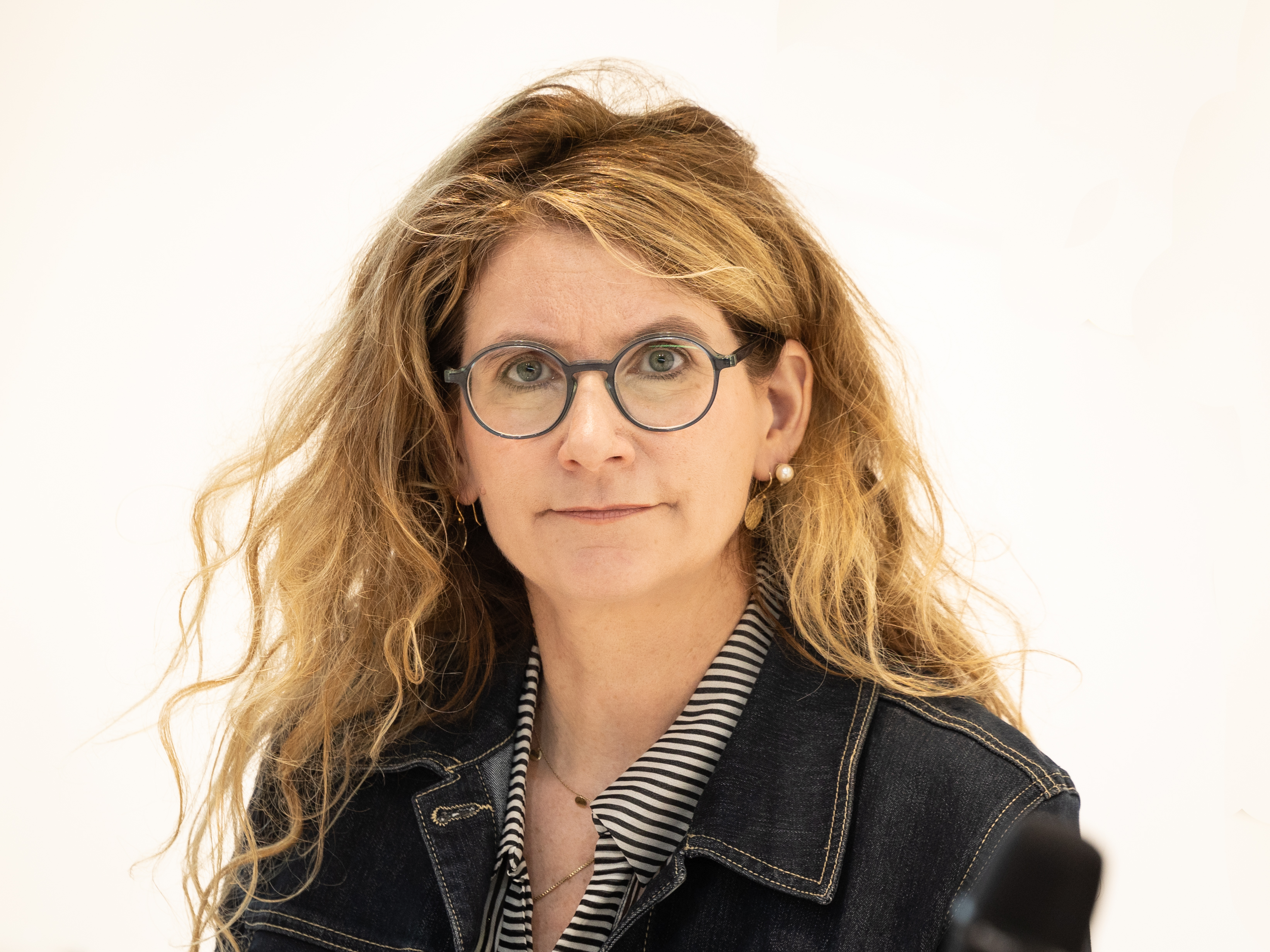
- Born: 20 October 1970 (age 55); Ostfildern, Baden-Württemberg, Germany
- Education: University of Hamburg
- Occupation: Author
- Spouse: Jan Bürger
- Children: 2

Anna Katharina Hahn is a German author.

== Life and works ==
Anna Katharina Hahn was born in Ruit (Ostfildern), a small town short distance to the south-east of Stuttgart.

She attended secondary school in nearby Stuttgart. Hahn won her first literary prize while still at school, coming first in a short story competition organised by the city authorities in 1988. On leaving school she enrolled at the Hamburg University where in 1995 she gained a "Magister degree" in German studies, English studies, and European Ethnology and Folklore. From 1996 to 2001 she worked as a research assistant in the German Bible Archive and in the manuscripts department of the Hamburg State and University Library.

Her first texts were academic in nature and dealt with the history of bibles in the late medieval period: at around the same time her literary texts began to appear in journals and anthologies. There were also two volumes of short stories: "Sommerloch" published in 2000 and "Kavaliersdelikt" in 2004.

In 2004 she took part in the Ingeborg Bachmann literary competition with her book "Kavaliersdelikt", which was listed for inclusion by Ursula März (as one of the jurors): on this occasion Hahn's book was not among the prize winners, however.

Her first full-length novel Kürzere Tage (Shorter Days) was published in 2009, and ranked ninth that year on a "SWR-Bestenliste". (Note: The SWR-Bestenliste was inaugurated in 1975. It is a list of books compiled monthly, based on the recommendations of (in 2020) 30 literary critics.)

Her 2012 novel, "Am Schwarzen Berg" (At the Black Mountain), deals playfully with motifs from Eduard Mörike, and was well received. The novel appeared on the shortlist for the Leipzig Book Fair Prize and the longlist for the Wilhelm Raabe Literature Prize.

Her novel "Das Kleid meiner Mutter" (My mother's dress), which appeared in 2016, deals with the impact of economic crisis in Spain. It received a more mixed response from at least some of the more mainstream German critics.

In 2018, Hahn was named "Mainzer Stadtschreiberin" by the television channels ZDF and 3sat, and the city of Mainz.

Anna Katharina Hahn is a member of PEN Centre Germany. She lives with her husband, the writer, archivist and literary scholar Jan Bürger, and their sons in Stuttgart.

== Output (selection) ==
- Sommerloch. (2000) a book of short stories.
- Kavaliersdelikt. (2004) a book of short stories.
- Kürzere Tage. (2009), novel.
- Am Schwarzen Berg (2012) novel.
- Das Kleid meiner Mutter (2016) novel.
- Aus und davon (2020) novel.

== Recognition ==
- 1999: Hamburg Literature Prize
- 2005: Clemens Brentano Preis from the city of Heidelberg
- 2006: Stipendium from the Baden-Württemberg Arts Foundation
- 2010: Heimito von Doderer Literature Prize
- 2010: Roswitha Prize
- 2012: Wolfgang Koeppen Prize from the city of Greifswald
- 2018: Kester Haeusler Special Award from the German Schiller Foundation
- 2018: Mainzer Stadtschreiber
- 2020: Shortlist of the Wilhelm Raabe Literature Prize.
- 2021: Order of Merit of Baden-Württemberg (German: Verdienstorden des Landes Baden-Württemberg).
