= Jan Arnald =

Swedish novelist and literary critic

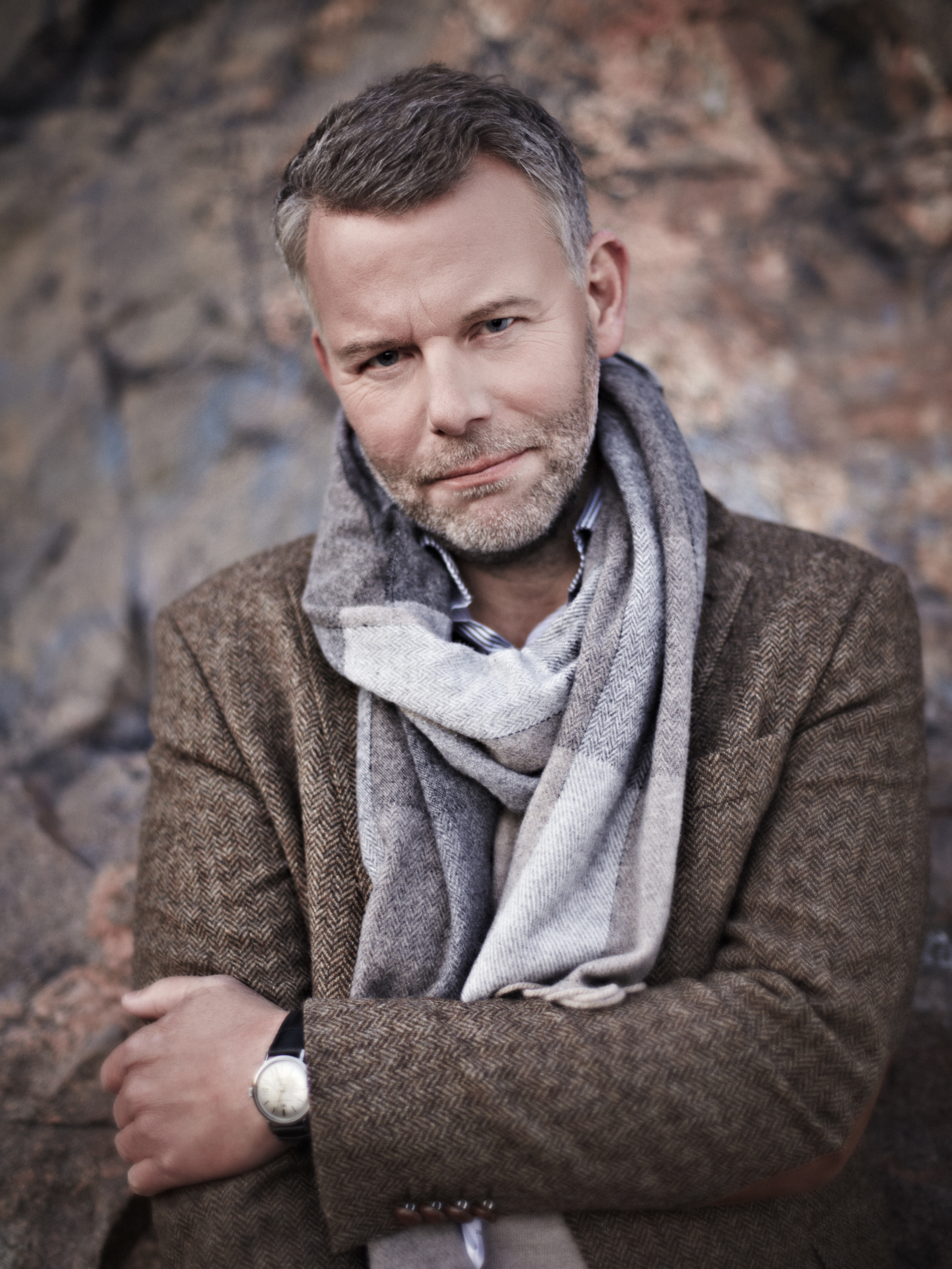
- Jan Arnald
- Born: 11 January 1963 (age 63)
- Occupations: Novelist, literary critic
- Writing career
- Pen name: Arne Dahl
- Genres: Crime fiction, mystery fiction,
- Subjects: crime, thriller, mystery
- Notable works: Ont Blod, Misterioso, Upp till toppen av berget
- Website: www.arnedahl.net

Jan Arnald (born 11 January 1963) is a Swedish novelist and literary critic, whose pen name is Arne Dahl. He has become famous with crime fiction, and he is also a regular writer in Swedish newspaper Dagens Nyheter.

He published Barbarer (2001) and Maria och Artur (2006) under his own name, but under his pen name he has written a series of crime novels about a fictional group of Swedish crime investigators, called "A Gruppen" in Swedish and "the Intercrime Group" in the first English translation. The books are translated into several languages. The first five books were made into 180-minute films, screened as two 90-minute episodes per story. The first, Misterioso, was screened on SVT1 in Sweden on 27 and 28 December 2011, with the following four stories shown in eight weekly instalments between October and December 2012. The series was picked up by BBC Four and screened on British television on Saturday nights as part of BBC Four's foreign crime series season starting in April 2013.

== Works written ==
=== As Jan Arnald ===
- Chiosmassakern (novel, 1990)
- Nalkanden (poetry collection, 1992)
- Genrernas tyranni (thesis, 1995)
- 3 variationer (prose, 1996)
- Klä i ord (stories, 1997)
- Barbarer (novel, 2001)
- Maria och Artur (novel, 2006)
- Intimus (novel, 2010)

=== As Arne Dahl ===
==== Intercrime series ====
- Misterioso (1999); English translation by Tiina Nunnally: Misterioso, (2010 - US title)/The Blinded Man (2012 - UK title)
- Ont blod (1998); Bad Blood (2013 - UK title)
- Upp till toppen av berget (2000); To the Top of the Mountain(2014 - UK title)
- Europa blues (2001)
- De största vatten (2002); Many Waters
- En midsommarnattsdröm (2003); A Midsummer Night's Dream
- Dödsmässa (2004); Requiem
- Mörkertal (2005); Hidden Numbers
- Efterskalv (2006); Afterquake
- Himmelsöga (2007); Eye in the Sky

==== Opcop quartet ====
- Viskleken (2011); Chinese Whispers
- Hela havet stormar (2012); Musical Chairs
- Blindbock (2013); Blindfold
- Sista paret ut (2014); Last couple out

The fourth installment of the series came out in spring 2014.

==== Berger & Bloom series ====
- Utmarker (2016); Watching you
- Inland (2017); Hunted
- Mittvatten (2018); You are next
- Friheten (2020)
- Islossning (2021)

==== Other books ====
- Elva (2008); Eleven

== Arne Dahl TV adaptations ==
The ten Intercrime novels have all been dramatised by Swedish production company Filmlance, the first five in 2011 and the rest in 2015. Filmlance is also responsible for the series Bron (shown in the UK as "The Bridge") and for the later Martin Beck detective programmes. Each story has been dramatised in the form of a two-part miniseries, each with two ninety minute episodes (series 1) or two one hour episodes (series two).

=== Series 1 (2011–2012) ===
A 2011 TV adaptation of five of the Arne Dahl stories was produced by Filmlance International (in co-production with several other European companies. Outside Sweden, the series was broadcast in the UK on BBC Four between April–June 2013, along with numerous other countries. The series is currently being broadcast in the United States through MHz Networks, most recently from November 2013 to January 2014.

No. overall	No. in season	Title	Original Swedish air date	Original UK air date	Swedish ratings	UK ratings
1	1	"The Blinded Man, Part 1" "Misterioso, Del 1"	27 December 2011	6 April 2013	1,554,000	900,000
1	2	"The Blinded Man, Part 2" "Misterioso, Del 2"	28 December 2011	13 April 2013	1,449,000	736,000
2	3	"Bad Blood, Part 1" "Ont blod, Del 1"	21 October 2012	20 April 2013	1,114,000	683,000
2	4	"Bad Blood, Part 2" "Ont blod, Del 2"	28 October 2012	27 April 2013	995,000	581,000
3	5	"To the Top of the Mountain, Part 1" "Upp till toppen av berget, Del 1"	4 November 2012	4 May 2013	1,062,000	762,000
3	6	"To the Top of the Mountain, Part 2" "Upp till toppen av berget, Del 2"	11 November 2012	11 May 2013	1,034,000	695,000
4	7	"Many Waters, Part 1" "De största vatten, Del 1"	18 November 2012	18 May 2013	1,151,000	656,000
4	8	"Many Waters, Part 2" "De största vatten, Del 2"	25 November 2012	25 May 2013	1,046,000	649,000
5	9	"Europa Blues, Part 1" "Europa blues, Del 1"	2 December 2012	1 June 2013	1,022,000	658,000
5	10	"Europa Blues, Part 2" "Europa blues, Del 2"	9 December 2012	8 June 2013	1,117,000	666,000

=== Series 2 (2015) ===
The last five novels in the Intercrime series were adapted for Series 2 of the popular Arne Dahl TV series, produced by Filmlance. They premiered in February 2015 in Sweden. The BBC began airing the second season on BBC Four in October 2015.

No. overall	No. in season	Title	Original Swedish air date	Original UK air date	Swedish ratings	UK ratings
1	1	"A Midsummer Night's Dream, Part 1" "En midsommarnattsdröm, Del 1"	15 February 2015	17 October 2015	N/A	TBA
1	2	"A Midsummer Night's Dream, Part 2" "En midsommarnattsdröm, Del 2"	22 February 2015	17 October 2015	N/A	TBA
2	3	"Requiem, Part 1" "Dödsmässa, Del 1"	1 March 2015	24 October 2015	N/A	TBA
2	4	"Requiem, Part 2" "Dödsmässa, Del 2"	8 March 2015	24 October 2015	N/A	TBA
3	5	"Hidden Numbers, Part 1" "Mörkertal, Del 1"	15 March 2015	31 October 2015	N/A	TBA
3	6	"Hidden Numbers, Part 2" "Mörkertal, Del 2"	22 March 2015	31 October 2015	N/A	TBA
4	7	"Aftershock, Part 1" "Efterskalv, Del 1"	29 March 2015	7 November 2015	N/A	TBA
4	8	"Aftershock, Part 2" "Efterskalv, Del 2"	5 April 2015	7 November 2015	N/A	TBA
5	9	"Eye in the Sky, Part 1" "Himmelsöga, Del 1"	12 April 2015	14 November 2015	N/A	TBA
5	10	"Eye in the Sky, Part 2" "Himmelsöga, Del 2"	19 April 2015	14 November 2015	N/A	TBA

== Prizes and awards ==
- 2003 The Palle Rosenkrantz prize, for Europa Blues
- 2005 Deutscher Krimi Preis, for Upp till toppen av berget
- 2006 Deutscher Krimi Preis, for Europa Blues
- 2007 Chosen by Reader's Digest as Europe's best crime novelist
- 2007 The Swedish Crime Writing Award
- 2010 The Radio Bremen Crime Fiction Award
- 2010 Nominated to European Crime Fiction Star Award 2010/11
- 2011 Best Swedish Crime Novel Award (Bästa svenska kriminalroman) for Viskleken
