= Matti Rönkä =

Finnish TV journalist (born 1959)

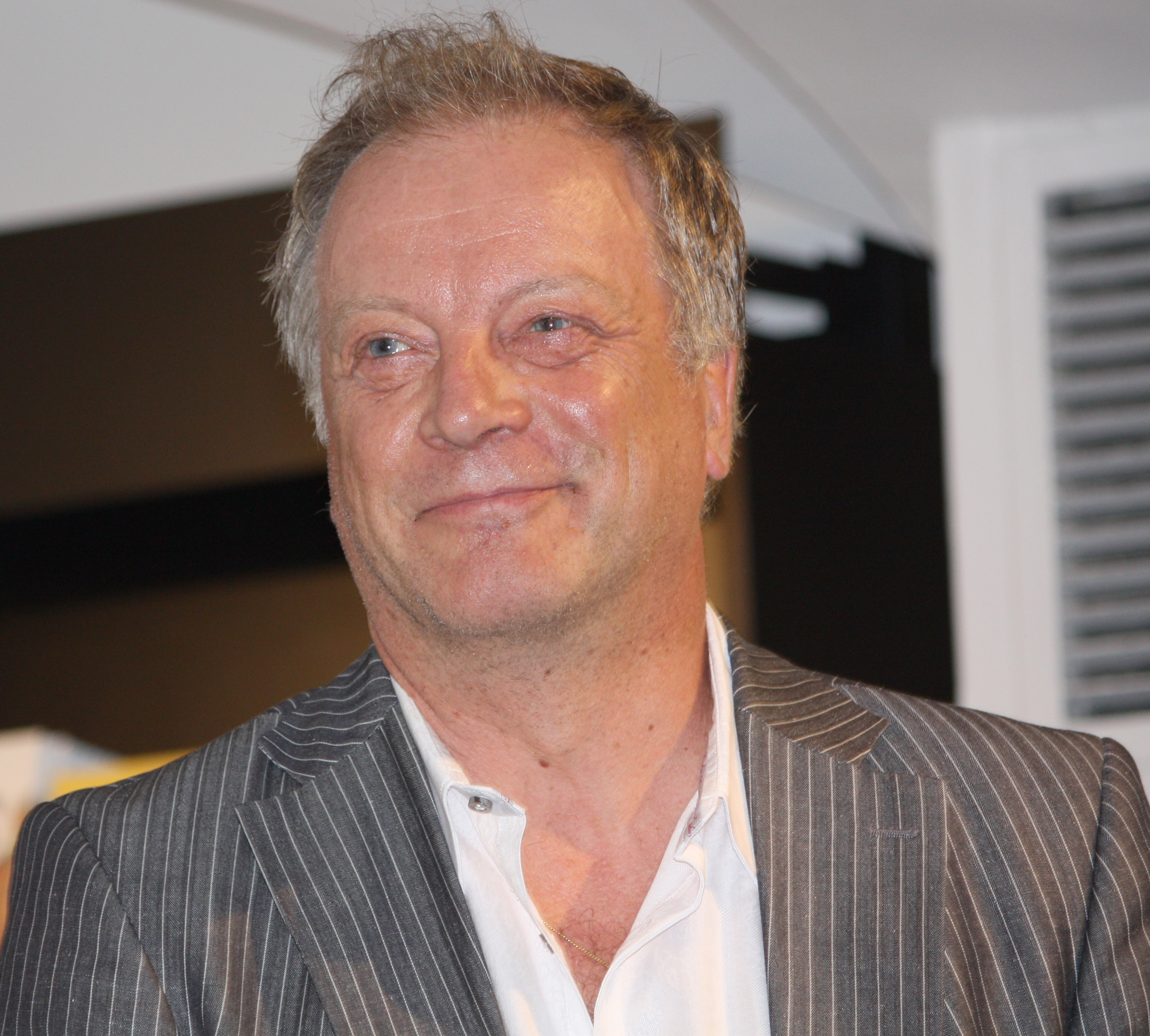
- Born: 9 September 1959 (age 67)
- Occupations: TV journalist and novelist
- Awards: Glass Key award (2007); Deutscher Krimi Preis third prize (2008)

Matti Rönkä (born 9 September 1959) is a Finnish TV journalist and novelist. He received the Glass Key award in 2007 for the crime novel Ystävät kaukana and the Deutscher Krimi Preis third prize in 2008 for the German translation of his novel Tappajan näköinen mies (2002) (German: Der Grenzgänger). He has been the anchor of the daily news program 20:30 National Report since 2003 on Yle, thus inheriting the nickname "Suomen ääni" (English: "The Voice of Finland") from the program's old host Arvi Lind.

== Bibliography ==
- 2002 Tappajan näköinen mies; English translation: A Man with a Killer's Face, 2017
- 2003 Hyvä veli, paha veli
- 2005 Ystävät kaukana
- 2007 Mies rajan takaa, an anthology comprising the three above
- 2008 Isä, poika ja paha henki
- 2009 Tuliaiset Moskovasta
- 2011 Väärän maan vainaja
