= Peter Zeindler =

Swiss writer (1934–2023)

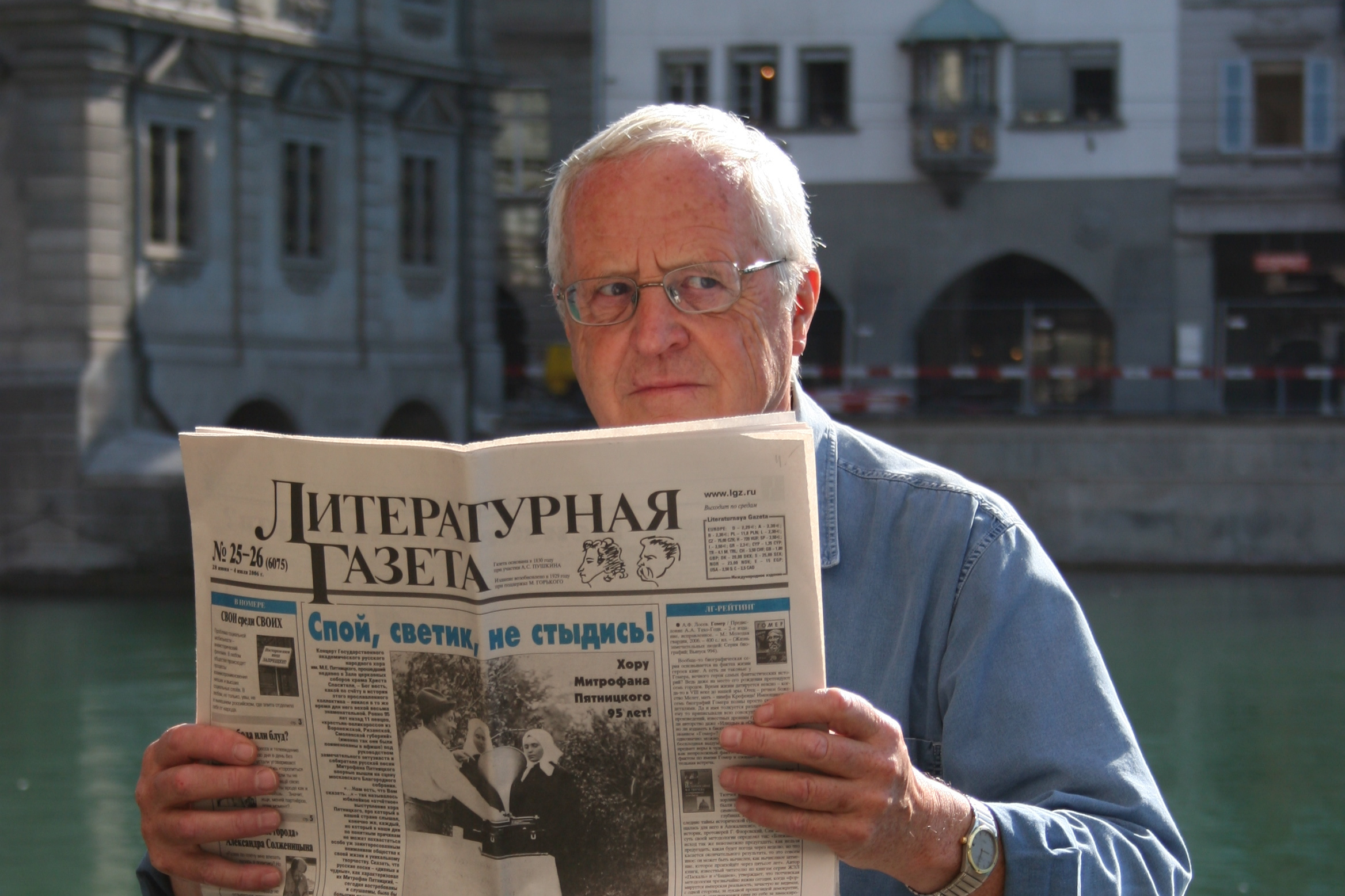
Zeindler in 2006

Peter Zeindler (18 February 1934 – 7 May 2023) was a Swiss journalist, crime fiction writer, and playwright. He was born and died in Zürich.

His play Der Eremit was first staged at the Stadttheater in Bern in 1966. The play Kurzschluss was first staged at the Badisches Staatstheater Karlsruhe in 1969. The comedy Der Kurgast was staged at Theater am Hechtplatz in Zürich in 1985.

Among his crime novels are Tarock from 1982, Die Ringe des Saturn from 1984, Der Zirkel from 1985, and Das Sargbukett from 1992. In 2009, he published the book Die Meisterpartie, a collection of criminal short stories.

He was awarded the Deutscher Krimi Preis four times, in 1986, 1988, 1990 and 1992. Among other awards is the Honorary Award from the city of Zürich in 1995.
