= Uta-Maria Heim =

German writer (born 1963)

- Born: 14 October 1963 (age 62); Schramberg, West Germany

Uta-Maria Heim (born 14 October 1963) is a German writer.

== Life ==
Heim was born in Schramberg in West Germany on 14 October 1963. She went to the University at Freiberg studying literature and sociology before taking her master's degree in Stuttgart. She then worked as a critic for the newspaper Stuttgarter Zeitung.

By 2006 she was a freelance writer creating radio plays, poems, plays and crime novels based in southern Germany.

== Awards ==
- 1992 German Crime Fiction Prize (National 3) for the Rats Principle
- 1994 German Crime Fiction Prize (National 2) for the City of Cockroaches
- 1994 Berlin Art Prize (Literature Award)
- 1998 Fellowship of the Villa Massimo
- 2000 Friedrich Glauser Prize for Little Angel end
