= Heimito von Doderer-Literaturpreis =

Heimito von Doderer Literature Prize
- Country: Germany (Cologne) / Austria (Origin)
- Status: Defunct (Last awarded 2010)
- First award: 1996
- Website: http://www.doderer-literaturpreis.de/

The Heimito von Doderer-Literaturpreis (Heimito von Doderer Literature Prize, short also: Heimito von Doderer Prize) was established in 1996 to commemorate the 100th birthday of Heimito von Doderer. It was created as a memorial to "one of the most important writers of the 20th century", and to honor a single work or life work of a contemporary writer who excels in "language of high sensitivity and originality in the tradition of Doderer.

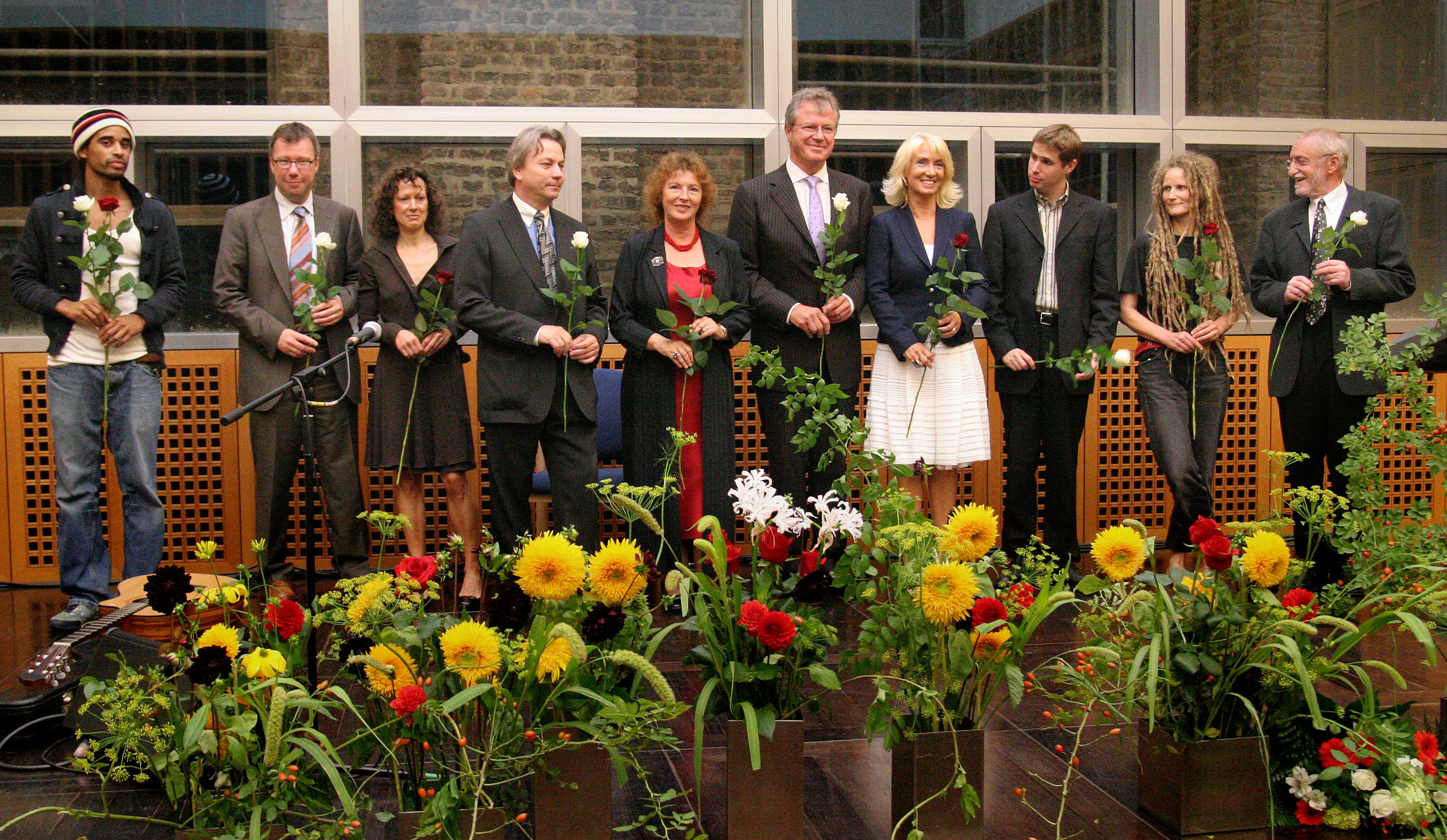
The awarding of the Heimito von Doderer Prize to Daniel Kehlmann in Cologne in 2006. Kehlmann is third from the right. The founder of the prize, Henner Löffler, is fifth from the right.

The award ceremony took place in 1996 in Vienna, in 1997 in Berlin, from 1998 the prize has been awarded in Cologne.

"Narrative strong debuts" are awarded the Hauptpreis (main prize), an addition a Förderpreis (funding price) has been awarded regularly, a Sonderpreis (special award) irregularly. The Main prize was 15,000 Euros (20,000 Euros in 2006), the Förderpreis 6,000 Euros (5,000 Euros).

The Heimito von Doderer Literature Prize was last awarded in 2010.

== Recipients ==
=== Hauptpreis ===
- 1996 Ror Wolf
- 1997 Peter Waterhouse
- 1998 Urs Widmer
- 1999 Martin Mosebach
- 2000 Walter Kempowski
- 2001 Galsan Tschinag
- 2002 Gerhard Polt
- 2004 Felicitas Hoppe and Anne Weber
- 2006 Daniel Kehlmann
- 2008 Jenny Erpenbeck
- 2010 Anna Katharina Hahn and Heinrich Steinfest

=== Förderpreis ===
- 1996 Stephan Wackwitz
- 1997 Thomas Meinecke
- 1998 Kathrin Schmidt
- 1999 Werner Fritsch
- 2000 Doron Rabinovici
- 2002 Marica Bodrožić
- 2006 Kerstin Młynkec
- 2008 Saša Stanišić

=== Sonderpreis ===
- 1998 Franz Josef Czernin (for literary essays)
- 2001 Erika Fuchs (for development of the German language)
- 2008 Reiner Stach (for the biography: Kafka: Die Jahre der Erkenntnis (Kafka: The Years of Realization)
