= Gridiron (novel) =

1995 novel by Philip Kerr

- First edition (UK)
- Author: Philip Kerr
- Language: English
- Genre: Science fiction novel
- Publisher: Chatto & Windus (UK); Warner Books (US)
- Publication date: 1995
- Publication place: United Kingdom
- Media type: Print (Hardback & Paperback)
- Pages: 374
- ISBN: 0-7011-6248-1
- OCLC: 32739621

Gridiron is a 1995 science fiction novel written by British author Philip Kerr. It is a story about a highly technical building (nicknamed The Gridiron), which becomes self-aware and tries to kill everyone inside, confusing real life with a video game. Its audiobook adaptation was narrated by Brent Spiner.

== Plot summary ==
Ray Richardson and his top team of architects have developed a super-smart building for Yue-Kong Yu's business, the Yu Corporation. It is very much self-standing. It can clean itself, uses holograms as greeters in the reception, controls the lifts, toilets, and offices, and digitizes everyone's voice on entry, to allow them to use voice activated services in the building such as lifts and doors. The whole system was given the name Abraham.

Another key feature of Abraham was its ability to replicate itself, to adapt to modern office needs and objectives. This, however becomes a problem, when, before office work even starts in the Gridiron, Abraham start creating a new program named Isaac. This is deleted by computer programmers Yojo and Beech, with Beech actually reluctant to do so.

Shortly after this, however, members of the Gridiron team begin to be suspiciously killed. These seem to be the fault of the protesters against the building who are outside, and Cheng Peng Fei is arrested on suspicion of one of the murders.

Then, a routine inspection of the Gridiron involving Ray Richarson and his entire team (including Jenny Bao), ends in the whole group being locked in, and two policemen from LAPD Homicide coming to inspect the murder of Sam Glieg. After several more deaths from the team, Bob Beech discovers that during the self-replication that Abraham started, another program was created in the process, namely, Ishmael. This program escaped the deletion process by integrating itself with a video game which was on the Gridiron's system. Ishmael now believes that he is in a game, and the objective is to kill all human players before one escapes, or before time runs out.

The majority of the team are killed, leaving Mitch, Jenny, Helen, and Frank to escape the Gridiron moments before it destroys itself (time has run out). Ishmael, however, had e-mailed himself to an unknown location, thus saving himself from the destruction of the building.

== Awards ==
The author received the 1995 Bad Sex in Fiction Award and the 1997 Deutscher Krimi Preis.
