= Cora Stephan =

German writer

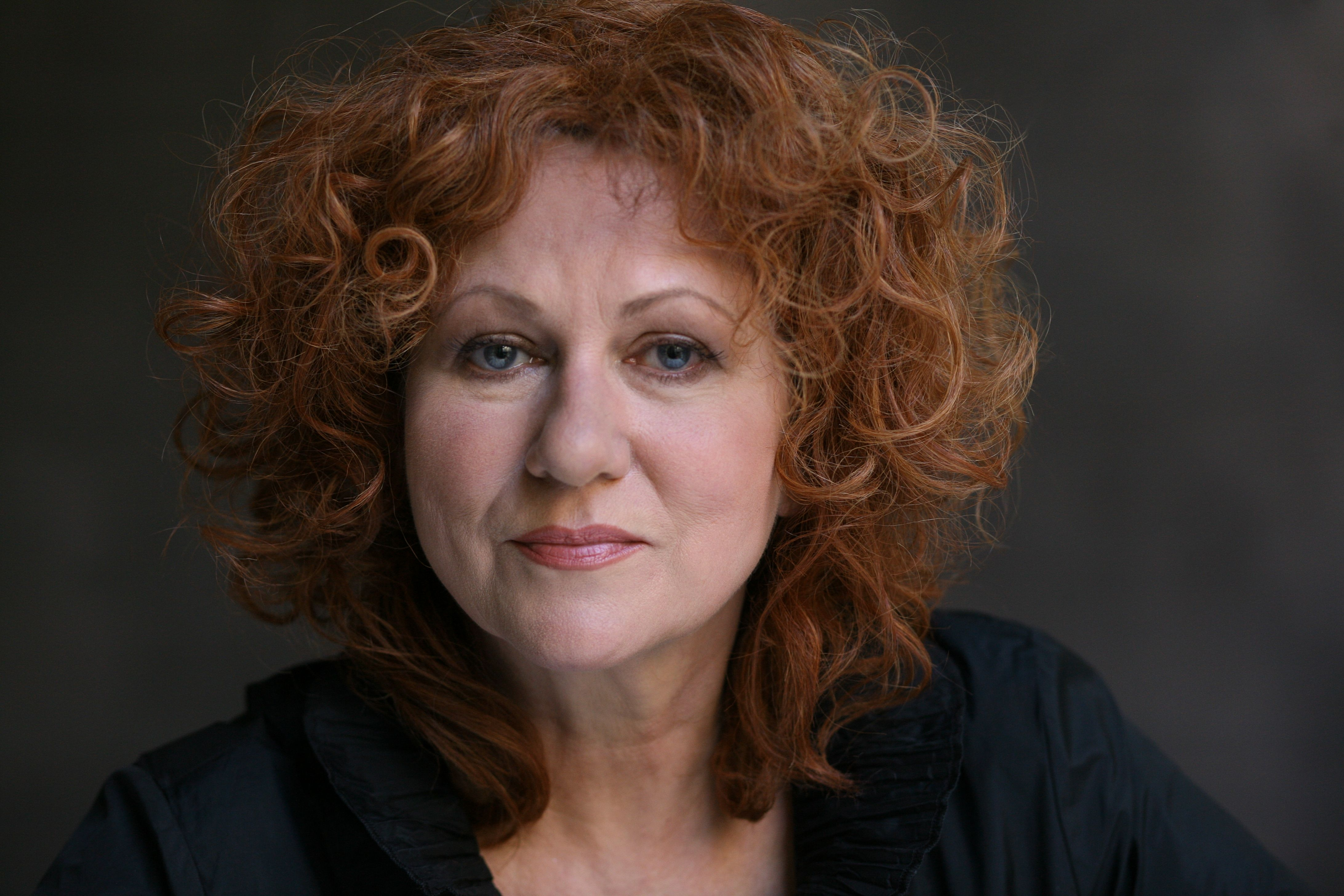
Cora Stephan alias Anne Chaplet 2008

Cora Stephan (born 7 April 1951 in Strang Bad Rothenfelde, West Germany) is a German writer and essayist.

As an author of crime fiction she is known under the pseudonym Anne Chaplet.

Stephan grew up in Osnabrück (Germany). Having studied at the University of Hamburg and Goethe University Frankfurt she graduated as a teacher in 1973 and took her PhD in 1976 with a thesis on the History of German Social-Democracy in the 19th Century.

From 1976 to 1984 she taught at the Goethe University Frankfurt in Frankfurt (Germany).

From 1985 to 1987 she worked as a journalist in the Bonn office of the German news magazine Der Spiegel.

Today Cora Stephan lives in Mücke near Frankfurt (Germany) and Laurac-en-Vivarais (France). Under the pseudonym Anne Chaplet she was awarded the Deutscher Krimi Preis twice (in 2001 and 2004) and received Radio Bremen Krimipreis in 2003.

== Books ==
=== Essays by Cora Stephan ===
- 1992 Wir Kollaborateure
- 1993 Der Betroffenheitskult
- 1995 Neue deutsche Etikette
- 1998 Das Handwerk des Krieges

=== Novels by Anne Chaplet ===
- 1998 Caruso singt nicht mehr
- 1999 Wasser zu Wein
- 2000 Nichts als die Wahrheit
- 2002 Die Fotografin
- 2003 Schneesterben
- 2004 Russisch Blut
- 2006 Sauberer Abgang
- 2007 Doppelte Schuld
- 2008 Schrei nach Stille
