= Mechtild Borrmann =

German author

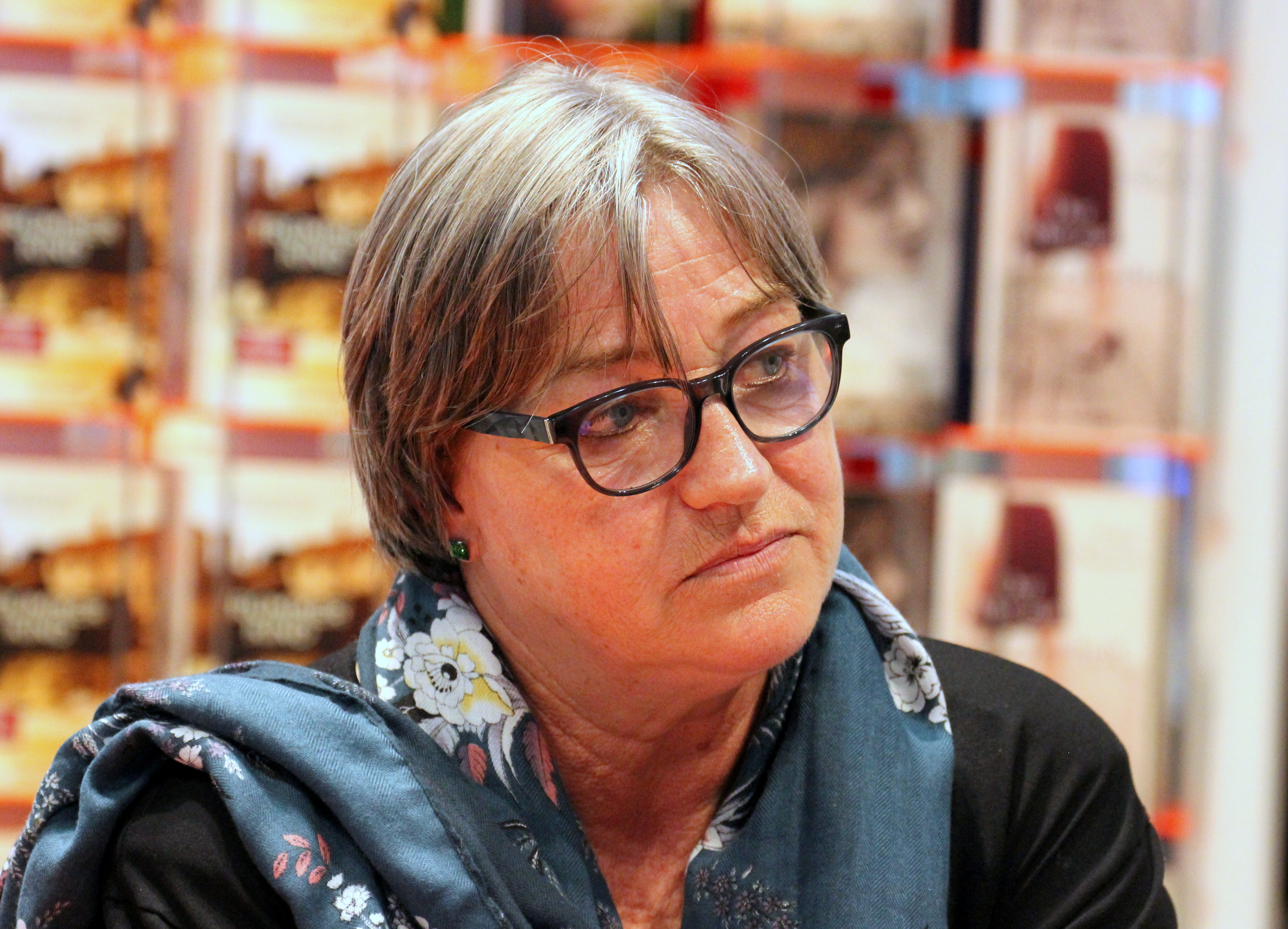
Mechtild Borrmann Frankfurt Book Fair 2018

Mechtild Borrmann (born 1960 in Cologne, West Germany) is a German writer, author of several detective novels.

== Biography ==
Borrmann trained in therapy through dance and theater, then worked in restoration.

In 2006, she published her first novel, Wenn das Herz im Kopf schlägt) (To Clear the Air), with which she won the 2012 Deutscher Krimi Preis. In 2014, her fifth detective novel was published, Der Geiger (The Violinist), which earned her the 2015 Grand prix des lectrices de Elle.

== Publications ==
Novels

- 2006: Wenn das Herz im Kopf schlägt. KBV-Verlag, Hillesheim, ISBN 978-3-93700-170-8
- 2007: Morgen ist der Tag nach gestern. Pendragon, Bielefeld, ISBN 978-3-86532-077-3
- 2009: Mitten in der Stadt. Pendragon, Bielefeld, ISBN 978-3-86532-128-2
- 2011: Wer das Schweigen bericht. Pendragon, Bielefeld, ISBN 978-3-86532-231-9
- 2012: Der Geiger. Droemer, Munich, ISBN 978-3-426-19925-1
- 2014: Die andere Hälfte der Hoffnung. Droemer, Munich, ISBN 978-3-426-28100-0
- 2016: Trümmerkind. Droemer, Munich, ISBN 978-3-426-28137-6
- 2018: Grenzgänger. Droemer, Munich, ISBN 978-3-426-28179-6
- 2022: Feldpost. Droemer, Munich, ISBN 978-3-426-44447-4

Narratives

- 2009: Freundschaftspreis. In OWL-kriminell. KBV-Verlag
- 2009: Seltene Seerose. In Mordswestfalen. Pendragon
- 2010: Aufnahme. In So wie du mir: 19 Variationen über Die Judenbuche by Annette von Droste-Hülshoff. Pendragon
- 2013: Die Spur zurück. Knaur, Münich, ISBN 978-3-426-43111-5 (ebook)

== Prizes and distinctions ==
=== Prizes ===
- 2012: Deutscher Krimi Preis for Wenn das Herz im Kopf schlägt
- 2015: Grand prix des lectrices de Elle for Der Geiger
