= Galsan Tschinag =

Mongolian writer (born 1943)

- Чинаагийн Галсан
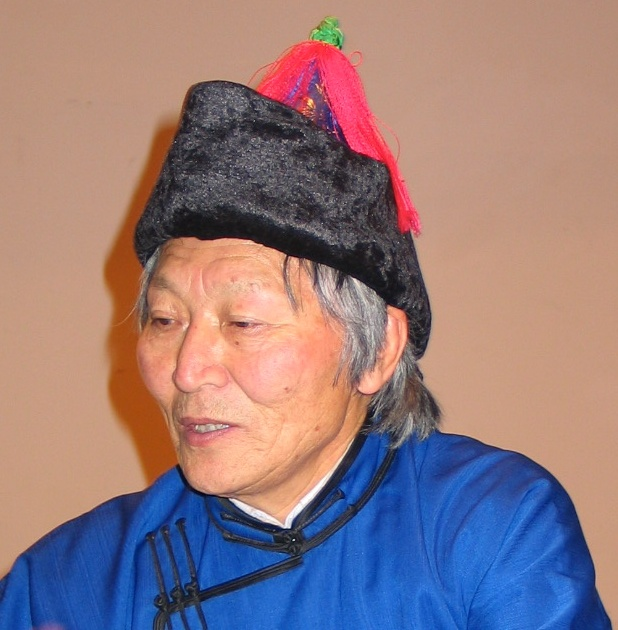
- Galsan at a reading in Munich in 2006
- Born: Irgit Shynykai oglu Churuk-Uvaa; 26 December 1943 (age 82); Bayan-Ölgii Province, Mongolian People's Republic
- Occupations: Poet; novelist; shaman; actor

Mongolian name
- Mongolian Cyrillic: Батдоржын Баасанжав
- Mongolian script: ᠴᠢᠨᠠᠭ᠎ᠠ ᠶᠢᠨ

Galsan Tschinag (Note: German pronunciation: [ˈɡalzan ˈtʃʰɪnak]; Mongolian: Чинаагийн Галсан, romanized: Qinaagiin Galsan, ᠴᠢᠨᠠᠭ᠎ᠠ ᠶᠢᠨ ᠭᠠᠯᠰᠠᠩ, [ˈtʃʰinɑːɡiːŋ ˈɢɑɮsəŋ]; Born Irgit Şınıkay oğlu Çuruk-Uvaa; Tuvan: Иргит Шыныкай оглу Чурук-Уваа, pronounced [iɾ.gitʰ ʃɯ̃.nɯ.ka̠j o̞ɣ.ɫu tʃu.ɾuk u.ʋa̠ː]) (born Irgit Şınıkay oğlu Çuruk-Uvaa, December 26, 1943), is a Mongolian writer of novels, poems, and essays in the German language, though he hails from a Tuvan background. He is also often described as a Shaman, and is also a teacher and an actor.

== Life ==
Born in Bayan-Ölgii Province in the upper Altai Mountains in western Mongolia, the youngest son of a Tuvan shaman, Galsan majored in German studies at the Karl Marx University in Leipzig, East Germany (1962-1968). He did his thesis work under Erwin Strittmatter, and upon graduation began to work as a German teacher at the National University of Mongolia. In 1976 his teaching license was revoked because of his "political untrustworthiness". He continued to work twelve-hour shifts, shuttling between all four of the Mongolian universities. In 1980, at the age of 36, Galsan was diagnosed with a life-threatening heart condition. He later recovered from the condition and credits his "shamanic powers" and plenty of exercise for saving his life.

Today, the author spends most of the year at his home in the Mongolian capital city of Ulaanbaatar, together with his family of nearly 20. He also spends much time giving readings in the German-speaking world and across Europe, as well as seeking to get closer to his Tuvan roots in the western Mongolian steppes. Though he still writes mainly in German, his books have been translated into many other languages. In addition to his writing, Galsan is an activist for the Tuvan minority and practices shamanistic healing.

== Works in English ==
- 2004 All the Paths Around Your Yurt (online poetry translation from Alle Pfade um deine Jurte, 1995)
- 2004 You Will Always Be Untamable (online poetry translation from Nimmer werde ich dich zähmen können, 1996)
- 2004 Cloud Dogs (online poetry translation from Wolkenhunde, 1998)
- 2004 Oracle Stones as Red as the Sun: Songs of the Shaman (online poetry translation from Sonnenrote Orakelsteine, 1999)
- 2004 The Stone Man at Ak-Hem (online poetry translation from Der Steinmensch zu Ak-Hem, 2002)
- 2006 The Blue Sky: A Novel (translation in print from Der blaue Himmel, 1994)
- 2007 Beyond the Silence (online poetry translation from Jenseits des Schweigens, 2006)
- 2007 The Gray Earth (translation in print from Die graue Erde, 1999)
- 2013 Wind of the Steppe, Wind of the World (online poetry translation from Steppenwind, Weltenwind, 2013)

== Works in German ==
(with tentative English titles)

- 1981 "Eine tuwinische Geschichte und andere Erzählungen" (A Tuvan Story and other short stories)
- 1993 "Das Ende des Liedes" (The End of it)
- 1994 "Der blaue Himmel" (The Blue Sky)
- 1995 "Zwanzig und ein Tag" (Twenty-One Days)
- 1996 "Nimmer werde ich dich zähmen können" (Never Will I Tame You)
- 1997 "Die Karawane" (The Caravan)
- 1997 "Im Land der zornigen Winde" (In the Land of the Angry Winds, with co-author Amelie Schenk)
- 1997 "Der siebzehnte Tag" (The Seventeenth Day)
- 1999 "Die graue Erde" (The Grey Earth)
- 1999 "Der Wolf und die Hündin" (The Wolf and the Bitch)
- 2000 "Der weiße Berg" (The White Mountain)
- 2001 "Dojnaa"
- 2001 "Das Ende des Liedes" (The End of the Song)
- 2002 "Tau und Gras" (Dew and Grass)
- 2003 "Die Karawane" (The Caravan)
- 2004 "Das geraubte Kind" (The Stolen Child)
- 2005 "Mein Altai – Erzählungen" (My Altai - Stories)
- 2007 "Die neun Träume des Dschinghis Khan" (The Nine Dreams of Genghis Khan)
- 2008 "Die Rückkehr" (The Return)
- 2008 "Auf der großen blauen Straße – Geschichten" (On the Big Blue Road - Stories)
- 2011 "Das andere Dasein" (A Second Existence)
- 2012 "Gold und Staub" (Gold and Dust)
- 2013 "Der Mann, die Frau, das Schaf, das Kind" (The Man, the Woman, the Sheep, the Child)

== Awards ==
- 1992 Adelbert-von-Chamisso-Preis
- 1995 Puchheimer Leserpreis
- 2001 Heimito von Doderer-Literaturpreis
- 2003 Danish Aloa Literature-Preis
- 2006 was recognized as a deserving cultural worker in Mongolia
- 2009 European Trebbia-Preis
- 2002 Order of Merit of the Federal Republic of Germany
- 2012 City of Marburg Literaturpreis
- 2015 Literatur Work Award for "Gold and Dust", "The Man, the Woman, the Sheep, the Child" and "My Altai"
- 2018 Highest award of the Republic of Tuva (Russia)
- 2023 Hero of Labour of Mongolia, Order of Sukhbaatar

== Bibliography ==
- Galsan Tschinag: A Searchable Bibliography
