= Gisbert Haefs =

German writer and translator

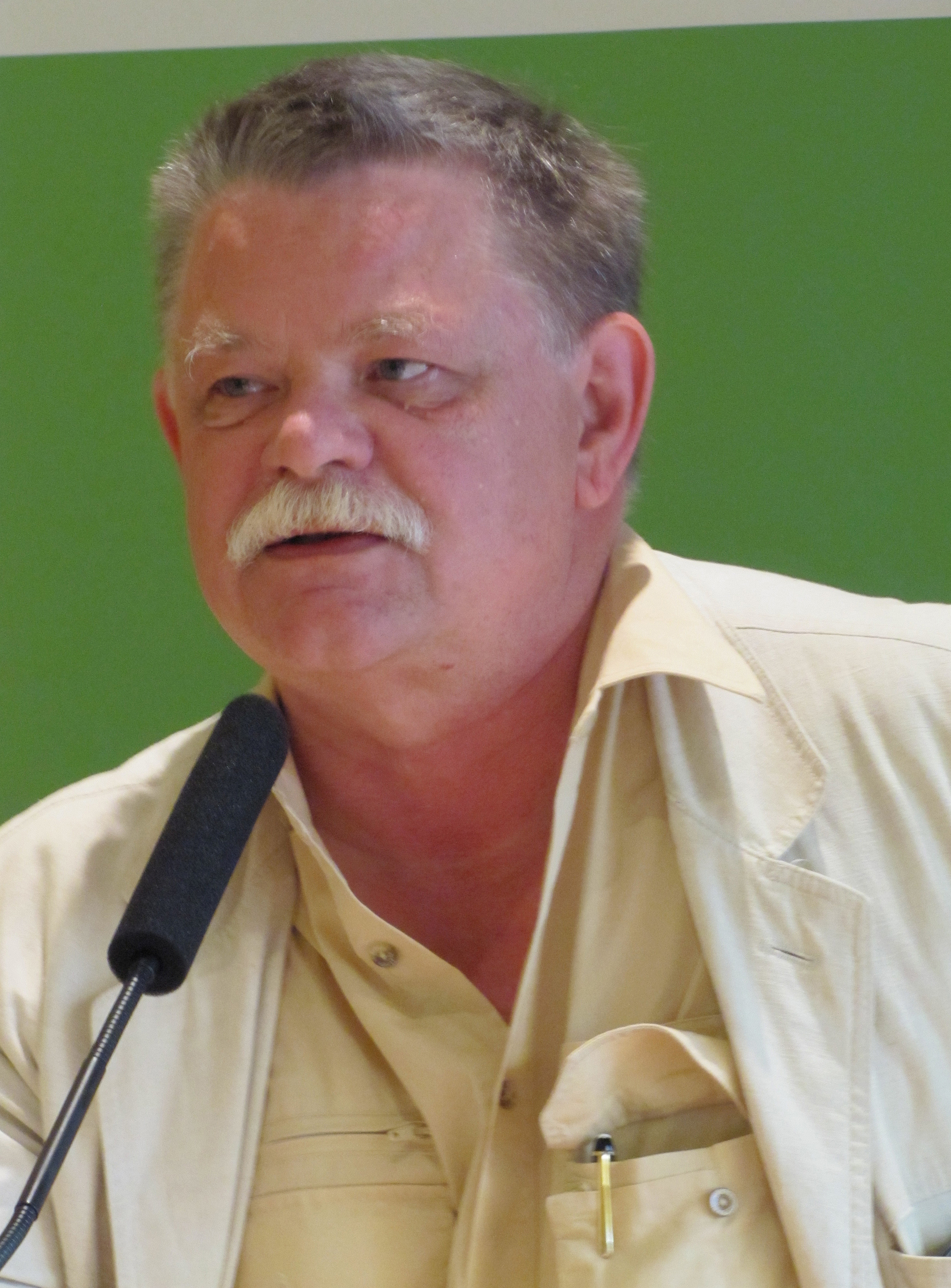
Gisbert Haefs, German writer, translator and publisher, 2010 in Frankfurt am Main, Germany.

Gisbert Haefs (born 9 January 1950) is a German writer in several genres and translator. He has written historical novels such as Alexander, won both the Deutscher Science Fiction Preis and Kurd-Laßwitz-Preis in science fiction, and placed at the Deutscher Krimi Preis for crime fiction. As a translator he worked on a much criticized effort at translating works of Jorge Luis Borges into German.

His sister is the writer and translator Gabriele Haefs.
