= Heinrich Steinfest =

Austrian writer (born 1961)

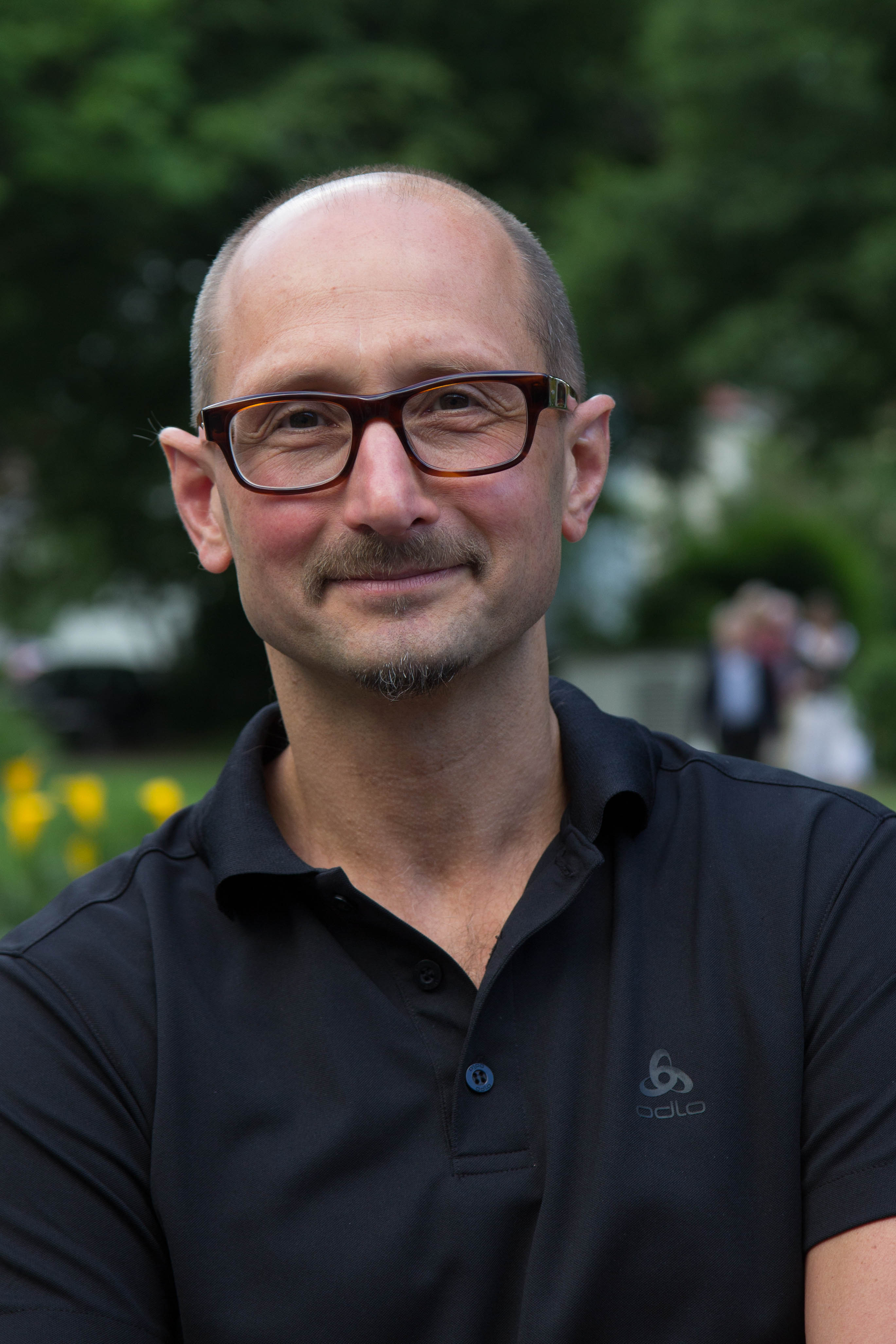
Heinrich Steinfest, Austrian writer at Hausacher Leselenz 2013

Heinrich Steinfest (born 10 April 1961 in Albury, Australia) is an Austrian writer of crime novels. Two years after his birth, his emigrant parents moved back to their native Vienna, where he lived until the late 1990s. He then moved to Stuttgart, where he lives today.

His novels contain bizarre examples of events that seemingly confound analysis. His most formidable character is Cheng, an Asian Viennese detective with no clear ties to China, born in Vienna to Chinese parents driven there by their enthusiasm for the Viennese waltz.

Awards he has won include the Deutscher Krimi Preis in 2004, 2006, 2008 and 2009. His novel Der Allesforscher was shortlisted for the German Book Prize in 2014. Steinfest dedicated this novel to his brother who, like the sister of the novel's protagonist, was killed in a mountaineering accident.
