= Jerry Oster =

- Born: January 22, 1943; Carlsbad, New Mexico
- Died: January 26, 2020 (aged 77); Chapel Hill, North Carolina
- Education: Columbia College
- Occupation: Writer
- Spouse: Trisha Lester
- Writing career
- Notable work: Sweet Justice

Jerry Oster (January 22, 1943 – January 26, 2020) was an American writer. His novels include Sweet Justice and Nowhere Man, about the investigations of New York Police Department Lt. Jake Neuman.

== Life and career ==
After graduating from Columbia College, Oster began his career in 1965 as a clerk and reporter for United Press International. He also worked as a reporter and film critic for Reuters and the New York Daily News. Oster was in a relationship with the musician Judy Collins in the 1970s. He published the crime novel Sweet Justice in 1985. It opens with the shooting of three young men on the New York City Subway; several media stories mentioned the parallels to the Bernhard Goetz incident, although Oster was inspired in part by a 1979 shooting on the IRT Lexington Avenue Line. Oster later worked for Duke University as an Associate in Research. His papers are held at University Libraries at Bowling Green State University.

== Critical reception ==
The New York Times noted that "the opening pages of Sweet Justice contain some uncanny premonitions of recent events on the real New York subway; they are also tense enough to arouse reasonably high expectations... If the excitement soon dissipates, it is not through any shortage of action. Indeed, part of the trouble is that Mr. Oster tries to pack in too much." A second review from the paper called the book "one of the most brilliant procedurals of the last few years, and it will be a scandal if it is not put up next year for an Edgar nomination"; the paper listed it as a "Notable Book" of 1985. The Ottawa Citizen stated that the writing "is crisp, plot top-notch and characters credible." Saint Mike, published in 1987, was also a New York Times Notable Book.

Charles Willeford, reviewing for the Miami Herald, called Nowhere Man "a romp of a novel." The Orlando Sentinel praised Oster's "sure grip on dialogue." The Washington Post admired Oster's "hip, ironic and sardonic" writing style. The Richmond Times-Dispatch said that Oster "makes the urban world come to life, dealing with contemporary situations with sharp dialogue, a clever style and humor, plus enough twisting plot elements to create high-powered suspense." The Calgary Herald labeled Oster "a master of stream-of-consciousness pyrotechnics with a mean-streets accent and a feel for down-and-dirty New York."

== Selected bibliography ==
- Municipal Bonds, 1981
- Sweet Justice, 1985
- Rancho Maria, 1986
- Nowhere Man, 1987
- Saint Mike, 1987
- Club Dead, 1988
- Internal Affairs, 1990
- Violent Love, 1991
- Fixin' to Die, 1992
- When the Night Comes, 1993
