= Andrea Bajani =

Italian novelist, poet and journalist (born 1975)

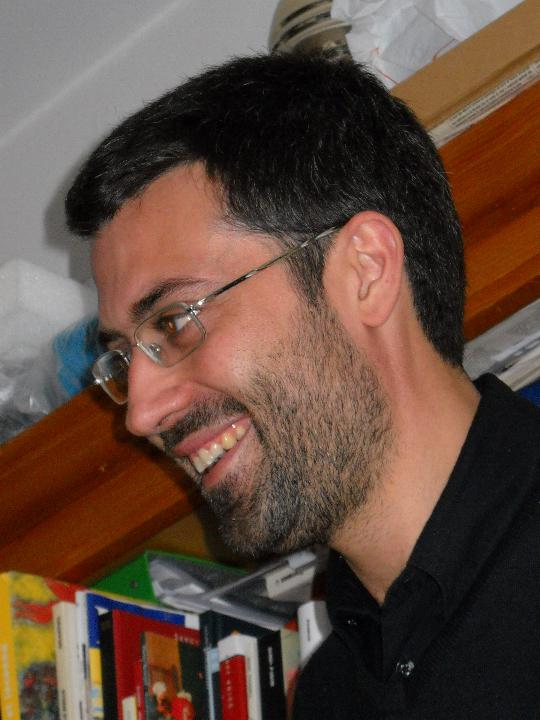
- Bajani in 2009
- Born: 16 August 1975 (age 51); Rome, Italy
- Occupations: Novelist, poet, journalist
- Writing career
- Language: Italian
- Period: 2000-present
- Genre: Literary realism
- Notable awards: Mondello Prize, Brancati Prize, Bagutta Prize, Strega Prize

Andrea Bajani (born 16 August 1975) is an Italian novelist, poet, and journalist. After his debut with Cordiali saluti (Einaudi, 2005), it was Se consideri le colpe (Einaudi, 2007) which brought him a great deal of attention. Antonio Tabucchi wrote about his debut novel, "I read this book with an excitement that Italian literature hasn't made me feel in ages." The book won the Super Mondello Prize, the Brancati Prize, the Recanati Prize and the Lo Straniero Prize.

After three years, with his novel Ogni promessa (Einaudi, 2010; published in English as Every Promise by MacLehose Press), he won the oldest Italian literary award, the Bagutta Prize. In 2013 he published Mi riconosci, a homage to the famous Italian writer Antonio Tabucchi.

His collection of short stories, La vita non è in ordine alfabetico (Einaudi, 2014) won the Settembrini Prize in 2014. His following novel wass Un bene al mondo (Einaudi 2016), and is currently being made into a film.In 2017 Einaudi published his first book of poems, Promemoria. The second one, Dimora naturale, was published in 2020. He is also an author of journalistic essays and regularly contributes to the daily newspaper La Repubblica.

In 2025, Bajani was awarded the Strega Prize for his novel L’anniversario (Feltrinelli), solidifying his reputation as one of Italy’s leading contemporary writers.

Bajani taught Creative Writing at the Scuola Holden in Turin, and has been Chief Editor for Italian fiction at Bollati Boringhieri publishing house since 2017. A book of literary criticism analyzing his work, written by Sara Sicuro and entitled Andrea Bajani. Una geografia del buio, was published in 2019.

== Writing ==
Bajani's best-known novel, Se consideri le colpe (Einaudi, 2007), won the Mondello Prize, the Recanati Prize, and the Brancati Prize. An English translation, If you Kept a Record of Sins, was published by Archipelago in 2021. Set between Italy and the booming industrial landscape of Romania teeming with Italian businessmen, it follows the story of Lorenzo, a son striving to come to terms with the memory of his estranged mother. Emmanuel Carrère described the novel as "at once masterful and very touching."

Ogni Promessa (Einaudi, 2010; published in English as Every Promise) is half a love story, half an exploration of memory and its power. From Sara and Pietro's struggle to conceive a child to the ghosts of World War II, to Italy's military attempts in Russia, the story moves between time and place, creating a vivid tangle of intersecting hopes, desires, and memories. Antonio Tabucchi described the novel as “A unique book that within the space of a novel produces a sort of concentrated comédie humaine, which upon reading expands and deflates, creating a narrative universe in development...a very special story whose themes recall the great classics.” De Telegraaf wrote of the book: “Andrea Bajani’s phrases are meandering and beautiful […]. Moving, poetic, exuberant."

La vita non è in ordine alfabetico (Einaudi, 2014) is a compilation of short stories in the vein of Italo Calvino, two for each letter of the alphabet. The style moves between poetry and prose, with seemingly unconnected stories linked together. An article in la Repubblica wrote of the book, "Bajani shows us that words can be knives, stones, soap bubbles, medicinal leaves, love potions or instruments of torture. Words are not just means of communication. They embody life, desire, the flesh. We don’t simply use words, we are made of them; we live and breathe through words." The Dutch novelist and poet, Cees Nooteboom, wrote "this book has touched a nerve".

Un bene al mondo (Einaudi, 2016) is the tale of a boy and his pain. Between fairy tales and magic realism, the book does not fall neatly into generic literary categories. Michael Cunningham described it thus: "Bajani is a true original. His prose is possessed of the simple, cadenced rhythm I associate with fairy tales, as is a certain, subtle sense of the fantastic in his imagery, though the story he’s telling is very much for adults, and takes place in an all-too-real world. Bajani’s work is suffused with a certain innocence that not only belies but intensifies the pain and anomie of which he writes...There's love, there's wonder, as well. There is, in short, much of what makes life worth writing about."

Il libro delle case (Feltrinelli, 2021) tells the story of a man called Io through the houses that he lived in. The story spans the life of Io from birth in 1975 to 2020 through short chapters, not in chronological order, describing the places where Io or other characters in the story have lived. The novel explores life, friendship, love and emotional struggles of Io through the rooms that witnessed them. The personal story of Io is weaved together with two momentous events: the kidnapping and subsequent killing of the prime minister Aldo Moro in 1978, and the discovery of the body of well-known writer and film-maker Pier Paolo Pasolini, killed in 1975.

L’anniversario (Feltrinelli, 2025) won the renowned Premio Strega. The novel tells the story of a son who had an intended complete termination of contact with his parents for ten years. It's also a precise portrait of the mother, a woman who had given up any resistance to her tyrannical husband.

== Bibliography ==
=== Novels ===
- Cordiali saluti (Einaudi, 2005). Yours Sincerely
- Mi spezzo ma non m'impiego (Einaudi, 2006). I Break, But I Don't Bend
- Se consideri le colpe (Einaudi, 2007). If You Kept a Record of Sins, trans. Elizabeth Harris (Archipelago Books, 2021)
- Domani niente scuola (Einaudi, 2008). No School Tomorrow
- Ogni Promessa (Einaudi, 2010). Every Promise, trans. Alastair McEwen (MacLehose Press, 2013)
- Mi riconosci (Feltrinelli, 2013). You Know Me
- Un bene al mondo (Einaudi, 2016). One Good Thing in the World
- Il libro delle case (Feltrinelli, 2021). The Book of Homes, trans. Elizabeth Harris (Deep Vellum, 2025)
- L'anniversario (Feltrinelli, 2025). The Anniversary, trans. Geoffrey Brock (Other Press, 2026)

=== Poetry ===
- Promemoria (Reminders) (Einaudi, 2017)
- Dimora naturale (Einaudi, 2020)
- L'amore viene prima (Feltrinelli, 2022)

=== Stories in collections ===
- Paolino e la vita di città in Opere d'inchiostro (Rubettino, 1999). ISBN 88-7284-824-5
- Vicini in Lettere in-chiostro (Marcovaldo; Addictions, 1999). ISBN 88-87376-08-5
- Il cielo dell'Africa è più grande che qui in Questa è l'Africa (Edizioni dell'Arco, 2004). ISBN 88-7876-004-8
- Storia di un altro impiegato in Deandreide (BUR, 2006). ISBN 88-17-00952-0
- All inclusive in Laboriosi oroscopi (Ediesse, 2006). ISBN 978-88-230-1151-9
- La data scritta in fondo in 1987/2007 I venti racconti + uno (Edizione speciale per Marie Claire, 2007)
- Forse si muore così in Mordi&Fuggi (Manni, 2007). ISBN 978-88-8176-936-0
- Grattacapo voce in Dizionario affettivo della lingua italiana (Fandango, 2008). ISBN 978-88-6044-065-5
- Non ci sono più le Vespe di una volta in ho visto cose (BUR, 2008). ISBN 978-88-17-02094-7
- Il quarto strato in Le nuove ricette del cuore (Blu Edizioni, 2008). ISBN 978-88-7904-062-4
- Andirivieni in Pene d'amore (Guanda, 2008). ISBN 978-88-6088-406-0
- La morte di Babbo Natale in Natale sotto la Mole (interlinea, 2008). ISBN 978-88-8212-649-0
- Tanto si doveva in Lavoro da morire. Racconti di un'Italia sfruttata, di AA.VV. (Einaudi, 2009). ISBN 978-88-06-19649-3
- A scuola sotto le macerie in Consiglio di classe (Ediesse, 2009). ISBN 978-88-230-1380-3

=== Reportage ===
- Mi spezzo ma non m'impiego (Einaudi, 2006). ISBN 88-06-18072-X
- Domani niente scuola (Einaudi, 2008). ISBN 978-88-06-19415-4

=== Other ===
- Scrivere non è importante, ma non si può fare altro in Il valore letterario nel romanzo del Novecento europeo – i quaderni del Baretti (Gribaudo, 2000). ISBN 9788880581321
- Il grande spot in Scrivere sul fronte occidentale (Feltrinelli, 2002). ISBN 88-07-49019-6
- Un tempo era il lavoro in Italia. Immagini e storia1945-2005 – 3. Il lavoro (volume supplement in the Unit)
- Parole a maglia in Annali 2007/III - Fondazione europea del disegno (Fondation Adami) (Bruno Mondadori, Ricerca, 2007). ISBN 9788861590519
- Prefazione a Venaria città reale by Ornella Orlandini (EGA Editore, Collana Immagini, 2008). ISBN 978-88-76706-89-9
- chi non muore si rivede racconto per il Natale 2008 by In Adv, Media By Design, Ineditha, Dgt Media. Volume stampato in trecento copie numerate.
- Tutti i bambini del mondo in la figlia di Isacco by Valerio Berruti (Damiano Editore, 2009). ISBN 978-88-6208-122-1
- La vita non è in ordine alfabetico (Einaudi, 2014). Life Is Not in Alphabetical Order
- Postfazione a Dal Comunismo al Consumismo by Mihai Butcovan - Marco Belli (La Carmelina Edizioni-Linea BN). ISBN 9788896437049

=== Translations into Italian ===
- sono un assassino (Je suis un assassin, Éditions du Rocher, 2002) by Laurent Graeve (Instar Libri, 2003). ISBN 88-461-0048-4
- Clima di paura (Climate of Fear, Profil Books Ltd., 2004) by Wole Soyinka ( with Mariapaola Pierini) (Codice edizioni, 2005). ISBN 88-7578-017-X
- Il piccolo principe (Le petit prince) (Einaudi, 2014)

=== Plays ===
- Acqua-Storie da un pianeta assetato, with Mariapaola Pierini, Produced by Onda Teatro, 2003
- Miserabili - Io e Margareth Thatcher, with Marco Paolini-Lorenzo Monguzzi-Michela Signori, produzione Michela Signori per JOLEFILM, 2007 (the show is also distributed on DVD and music on CD)
- "18.000 giorni" Il pitone, Produced by Fuorivia and Teatro Stabile di Torino, 2010
