= Zoë Beck =

German author, translator and publisher (born 1975)

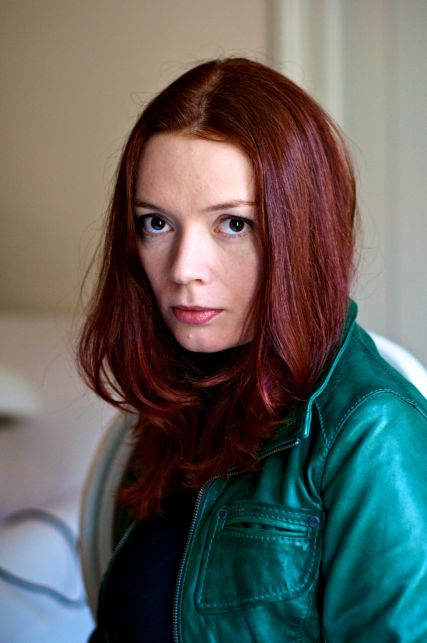
- Born: 12 March 1975 (age 51) Lahn-Dill-Kreis, Germany
- Occupation: Writer, publisher, translator, dubbing director
- Notable works: Normale Menschen, Fade to Black, Ein zufriedener Mann. Erzählungen, A Contented Man and Other Stories

Website
- zoebeck.blog

Zoë Beck (born 12 March 1975 as Henrike Heiland in Ehringshausen in the Lahn-Dill district) is a German writer, publisher, translator, dialogue book author and dubbing director. She has won multiple awards for her books and translations.

== Life ==
At the age of three she began to play the piano. Numerous performances and multiple awards at competitions followed. After graduating from high school she studied German and English literature in Giessen, Bonn and Durham as a scholarship holder of the German National Academic Foundation. She completed her studies with a master's thesis on the crime writer Elizabeth George. She then worked as an editor and TV producer for the Kirch Group. Since 2004 she has been working as a freelance author and lives in Berlin.

Beck first wrote screenplays, including the Christmas film "In der Weihnachtsbäckerei" (In the Christmas Bakery) with Rolf Zuckowski for ZDF children's television, various episodes of Tabaluga tivi, Nelly Net(t) and the German version of the sitcom Disney's Kurze Pause for the Disney Channel. Since 2006 she has been publishing mainly prose as a writer.

After surviving cancer in 2007 she changed her name to Zoë Beck.

Together with Jan Karsten Beck, she founded the literary publishing house CulturBooks in 2013. The publishing house emerged from the online feuilleton Culturmag.

In addition to her writing, Zoë Beck works as a literary translator and dubbing director for film and television (including Hackerville, Dietland, The Terror, The Mist, Fear the Walking Dead, Orange Is the New Black, Followers). From September 2013 to August 2014, she was the columnist for the SWR2 programme LiteraturEN, a radio column that is awarded to a different contemporary author each year, and subsequently wrote literary reviews for the station.

Zoë Beck acts as their German voice on reading tours of international authors, for example for Denise Mina, Val McDermid, Louise Welsh and Carl Nixon. She is on the board of directors of LitProm, a member of the PEN Centre Germany, co-founder of the feminist writers' network "Herland" and co-initiator of the action alliance #verlagegegenrechts. At the Leipzig Book Fair 2018 and 2019, she organised, among other things, the event series "Die Gedanken sind bunt". Beck has been a member of the jury for the Kurt Tucholsky Prize since 2018.

== Awards ==
- 2010 Friedrich-Glauser-Preis
- 2011 Friedrich-Glauser-Preis, Nomination
- 2012 September, KrimiZEIT-Bestenliste
- 2013 Goldene Leslie, Nomination
- 2014 January, February, March, KrimiZEIT-Bestenliste
- 2014 Radio-Bremen-Krimipreis
- 2014 Virenschleuder-Preis, Marketingpreis der Frankfurter Buchmesse, Kategorie „Persönlichkeit“
- 2014 25 Frauen für die digitale Zukunft
- 2015 March, April, May, June KrimiZEIT-Bestenliste
- 2015 Buchkultur: Die besten Krimis der Saison Top 10
- 2016 Deutscher Krimi Preis, Category „National“, 3. Platz
- 2017 July, August Krimibestenliste der FAS/Deutschlandfunk Kultur
- 2017 Internationaler Literaturpreis des Haus der Kulturen der Welt und der Stiftung Elementarteilchen, Nomination
- 2018 Goldene Auguste, Award for her services to women's crime literature
- 2018 Wiesbadener Krimistipendium 2019
- 2019 Kurd-Laßwitz-Preis for Best Translation to Science Fiction for Pippa Goldschmidt, "Von der Notwendigkeit, den Weltraum zu ordnen", nomination
- 2020 July, August, September Krimibestenliste of the FAS/Deutschlandfunk Kultur
- 2020 Krimifuchs of the City of Berlin (Berlin Crime Prize)
- 2020 German Crime Fiction Prize, "National" category, 1st place for Paradise City
- 2021 Friedrich-Glauser-Preis, category novel, nomination for Paradise City
- 2021 Political Crime Prize of the Heinrich Böll Foundation Baden-Württemberg 2021 for Paradise City
- 2021 Kurd-Laßwitz Prize for Best German-language science fiction novel, nomination
- 2021 Town Clerk in Tampere, Finland

== Work ==
=== Novels (Name: Zoë Beck) ===
- Wenn es dämmert, Kriminalroman, Lübbe, 2008, ISBN 978-3-404-15900-0
- Das alte Kind, Kriminalroman, Lübbe, 2010, ISBN 978-3-404-16443-1
- Der frühe Tod, Kriminalroman, Bastei Lübbe, 2011, ISBN 978-3-404-16309-0
- Edvard, Jugendroman, Baumhaus, 2012, ISBN 978-3-8339-0053-2
- Das zerbrochene Fenster, Kriminalroman, Bastei Lübbe, August 2012, ISBN 978-3-404-16046-4
- Brixton Hill, Thriller, Heyne, Dezember 2013, ISBN 978-3-453-41042-8
- Schwarzblende, Thriller, Heyne, März 2015, ISBN 978-3-453-41043-5
- Die Lieferantin, Thriller, Suhrkamp, Juni 2017, ISBN 978-3-518-46775-6
- Paradise City, Thriller, Suhrkamp, Juni 2020, ISBN 978-3-518-47055-8

=== Short Prose (Name: Zoë Beck) ===
- Das Haus im Lieper Winkel (in: Endstation Ostsee, Hg. H.P. Karr; KBV), 2009, ISBN 978-3-940077-54-7
- Draußen. (in: München blutrot, Hg. A. Izquierdo, A. Esser), Kölnisch-Preußische Lektoratsanstalt, 2009, ISBN 978-3-940610-07-2
- Rapunzel (in: Die Märchenmörder, Hg. A. Izquierdo, A. Esser), Kölnisch-Preußische Lektoratsanstalt, 2010, ISBN 978-3-940610-12-6
- Ein zufriedener Mann (in: Berlin blutrot, Hg. A. Izquierdo, A. Esser), Kölnisch-Preußische Lektoratsanstalt, 2011, ISBN 978-3-940610-13-3
- Dorianna (in: Maria, Mord und Mandelplätzchen, Hg. Michelle Stöger), Knaur, 2011, ISBN 978-3-426-51013-1
- Welthauptstadt der Agoraphobiker (in: I hate Berlin, Hg. Moritz Kienast), Lübbe, 2011, ISBN 978-3-431-03847-7
- Weihnachtsdrücken (in: Lasst uns roh und garstig sein, Hg. Dietmar Bittrich), rororo, 2011, ISBN 978-3-499-62802-3
- Kerzenschein (in: Süßer die Morde nicht klingen, Hg. Cornelia Kuhnert, Richard Birkefeld), Heyne, 2012, ISBN 978-3-453-54013-2
- Stilles Wasser (in: Heide, Harz und Hackebeil, Hg. Cornelia Kuhnert, Richard Birkefeld), KBV, 2013, ISBN 978-3-942446-77-8
- Freundin. (in: Unter vier Augen – Sprachen des Porträts, Hg. Kirsten Voigt), Kerber, 2013, ISBN 978-3-86678-812-1
- Die Stimme (in: Eiskalte Weihnachtsengel, Hg. Cornelia Kuhnert), Heyne, 2013, ISBN 978-3-453-43752-4
- Berliner Leber (in: Mörderische Leckerbissen, Hg. Cornelia Kuhnert, Richard Birkefeld), dtv, 2013, ISBN 978-3-423-21476-6
- Rot wie Schnee (in: Den nächsten, der Frohe Weihnachten zu mir sagt, bringe ich um), Droemer, 2013, ISBN 978-3-426-19986-2
- Ein zufriedener Mann. Erzählungen, CulturBooks, July 2014, ISBN 978-3-944818-36-8
- Remember, remember, Knaur eBook, November 2014, ISBN 978-3-426-43282-2
- Pfau 117 (in: Irgendwo ins grüne Meer: Geschichten von Inseln, Hg. Anne von Canal, Isabel Bogdan), Arche, May 2016, ISBN 978-3-7160-2743-1
- Fake It Or It Didn't Happen (Ausstellungskatalog Kunst Museum Winterthur für die Ausstellung von Karin Sander), Verlag Walther König, September 2018, ISBN 978-3-96098-454-2

=== Non-fiction books ===
- Depression. 100 Seiten, Reclam, May 2021, ISBN 978-3-15-020575-4

=== Novels (Name: Henrike Heiland) ===
- Späte Rache, Kriminalroman, Bastei Lübbe, 2006, ISBN 978-3-404-15505-7
- Zum Töten nah, Kriminalroman, Bastei Lübbe, 2007, ISBN 978-3-404-15629-0
- Blutsünde, Kriminalroman, Bastei Lübbe, 2007, ISBN 978-3-404-15742-6
- Von wegen Traummann!, Roman, Heyne, 2010, ISBN 978-3-453-40701-5
- Für immer und ledig?, Roman, Heyne, 2011, ISBN 978-3-453-40779-4

=== Prose (Name: Henrike Heiland) ===
- Der unglückliche Herr Dr. von und zu Wittenstein (in: Hell's Bells, Hg. Christiane Geldmacher), Poetenladen, 2008, ISBN 978-3-940691-02-6
- Leaving Lüdenscheid, oder: Opa muss weg (in: Mord am Hellweg IV, Hg. H. Knorr, H.P. Karr), Grafit, 2008, ISBN 978-3-89425-352-3
- Diese Sache in Rostock (in: Endstation Ostsee, Hg. H.P. Karr), KBV, 2009, ISBN 978-3-940077-54-7
- Konkurrenzausschluss (in: München blutrot, Hg. A. Izquierdo, A. Esser), Kölnisch-Preußische Lektoratsanstalt, 2009, ISBN 978-3-940610-07-2
- Bullets Over Bochum (in: Hängen im Schacht, Hg. H.P. Karr; KBV), 2009, ISBN 978-3-940077-67-7
- Hell-go-land (in: Morden zwischen den Meeren: Kleine Verbrechen aus Schleswig-Holstein, Hg. Jobst Schlennstedt), Pendragon, 2010, ISBN 978-3-86532-193-0
- Starnberger Strafvollzug (in: Tod am Starnberger See, Hg. Sabine Thomas), Gmeiner, 2010, ISBN 978-3-8392-1103-8
- Exile on Genfbachstraße (in: Nordeifel Mordeifel, Hg. R. Kramp), KBV, 2010, ISBN 978-3-940077-87-5
- Die Dreizehn (in: Hamburg blutrot, Hg. A. Izquierdo, A. Esser), Kölnisch-Preußische Lektoratsanstalt, 2010, ISBN 978-3-940610-10-2
- Zum Kuckuck! (in: Die Mütter-Mafia und Friends: Das Imperium schlägt zurück, Hg. Kerstin Gier), Bastei Lübbe, 2011, ISBN 978-3-404-16043-3
- Gmundner Alibi (in: Tod am Tegernsee, Hg. Sabine Thomas), Gmeiner, 2011, ISBN 978-3-8392-1195-3
- Onkel Horst vom Schillerplatz (in: Das Mordshaus an der Lahn, Hg. Klaus J. Frahm), KBV, 2011, ISBN 978-3-942446-23-5

=== Translations (selected) ===
- Steve Caplin and Simon Rose: Best of Papa: Geniale Ideen, die Vätern und Kindern Spaß machen. Bastei Lübbe, Bergisch Gladbach 2008, ISBN 978-3-404-66424-5.
- Pippa Goldschmidt: Der südlichste Punkt. CulturBooks, Hamburg 2013, ISBN 978-3-944818-19-1.
- Pippa Goldschmidt: Von der Notwendigkeit, den Weltraum zu ordnen. CulturBooks, Hamburg 2014, digital edition ISBN 978-3-944818-45-0.
- Pippa Goldschmidt: Weiter als der Himmel. Weidle Verlag, Bonn 2015, ISBN 978-3-938803-65-3.
- James Grady: Die letzten Tage des Condor. Suhrkamp, Berlin 2016, ISBN 978-3-518-46685-8.
- Amanda Lee Koe: Ministerium für öffentliche Erregung. CulturBooks, Hamburg 2016, ISBN 978-3-95988-018-3.
- Karan Mahajan: In Gesellschaft kleiner Bomben. CulturBooks, Hamburg 2017, ISBN 978-3-95988-022-0.
- Gerald Seymour: Vagabond. (with Andrea O'Brien) Suhrkamp, Berlin 2017, ISBN 978-3-518-46742-8.
- Pippa Goldschmidt: Von der Notwendigkeit, den Weltraum zu ordnen. CulturBooks, Hamburg 2018, expanded and revised new edition, print. ISBN 978-3-95988-098-5.
- Denise Mina: Blut, Salz, Wasser. Argument Ariadne, Hamburg 2018, ISBN 978-3-86754-230-2.
- Helen Oyeyemi: Was du nicht hast, das brauchst du nicht. CulturBooks, Hamburg 2018, ISBN 978-3-95988-103-6.
- Lesley Nneka Arimah: Was es bedeutet, wenn ein Mann aus dem Himmel fällt. Culturbooks, Hamburg 2019, ISBN 978-3-95988-105-0.
- Sally Rooney: Gespräche mit Freunden. Luchterhand Literaturverlag, Munich 2019, ISBN 978-3-630-87541-5.
- Denise Mina: Klare Sache. Argument Ariadne, Hamburg 2019. ISBN 978-3-86754-242-5.
- Sally Rooney: Normale Menschen. Luchterhand Literaturverlag, Munich 2020, ISBN 978-3-630-87542-2.
- Camilla Grudova: Das Alphabet der Puppen. Culturbooks, Hamburg 2020, ISBN 978-3-95988-150-0.
- Ling Ma: New York Ghost. Culturbooks, Hamburg 2021, ISBN 978-3-95988-152-4.
- Sally Rooney: Schöne Welt, wo bist du. Ullstein, Berlin 2021, ISBN 978-3-546-10050-2.
