= Ursula März =

German author and literary critic (born 1957)

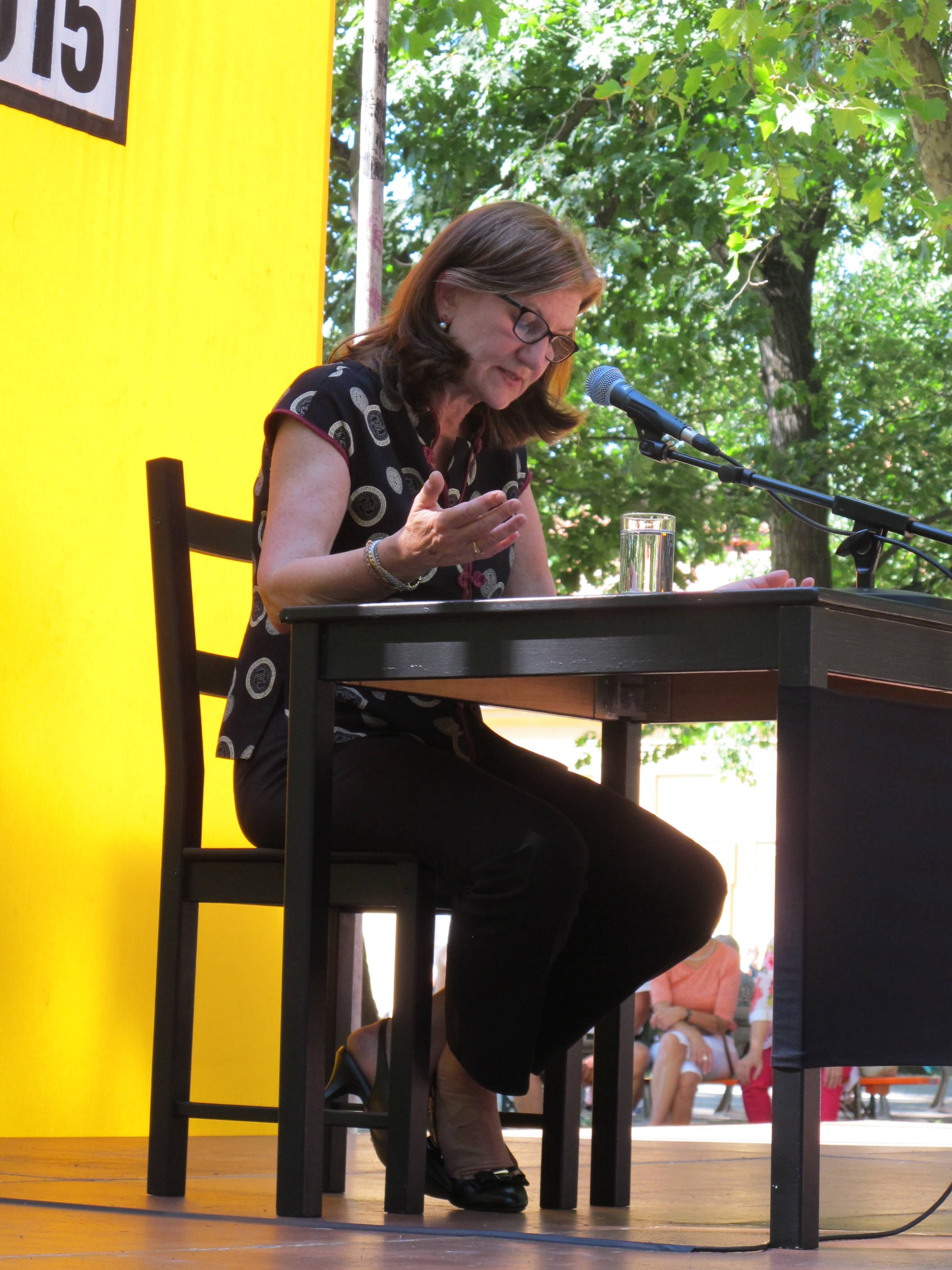
- Ursula März at the "Erlanger Poetenfest" (literary festival) in 2015
- Born: 1957 (age 68–69); Herzogenaurach (Erlangen), Bavaria, West Germany
- Occupations: Author; Literary Critic; Court reporter

Ursula März (born 1957) is a German author and literary critic-commentator.

== Life ==
Ursula März was born at Herzogenaurach, a mid-sized town on the edge of Erlangen in Franconia (Bavaria). She completed her schooling at nearby Erlangen, a pupil at the Humanistisches Gymnasium Fridericianum (secondary school). Decades later, in an essay concerning her first holiday on the Baltic Sea (and the first time in her life, already aged 16, she had seen the sea) she wrote about her school-days, including the pleasing recollection that "as a non-academic child [she had] not felt in any way disadvantaged [at the school]". März was taught, for a brief period, by Hannelore Schlaffer, then a temporary teacher who was at that time studying at the University of Erlangen. Schlaffer was already attracting attention on account of her abilities and enthusiasm as a literary scholar: März was deeply influenced by the trainee teacher, in ways which later affected her own career choices. As a school girl, however, other priorities prevailed: there was teenage rebellion to be attended to. März had her own experiences with hashish and with the "gruesome cocktail of Fanta-gin". She was a member of the school's little "Communist/Marxist-Leninist cadre" until pupil comrades, horrified to discover that she had been reading Kafka novels, threw her out of their group. Secretly, she hitchhiked round the local countryside because her parents had vetoed hitchhiking. Even more secretly, she took a cleaning job, working in a discotheque run for the benefit of locally stationed American soldiers.

Passing her Abitur opened the way to university-level education, and she went on to study Literature and Philosophy at Cologne and Berlin, receiving her degree from the latter. That was followed by an internship at the Hessische/Niedersächsische Allgemeine (newspaper) in Kassel. After that she worked as a radio script writer, contributing reportage, features and radio plays.

Since the start of the 1990s, März has been working as a literary critic and feuilleton features journalist for publications such as the quarterly arts and culture journal Kursbuch, the daily newspaper Frankfurter Rundschau and the weekly newspaper Die Zeit. One highlight was a widely commended literary portrait she wrote for the Frankfurter Rundschau of the Swiss-born author Paul Nizon. Another piece that won powerful plaudits was her 1999 biographical essay, "Du lebst wie im Hotel" ("You live as though in an hotel") on the polymath-photographer Ré Soupault.

In 2002, März joined the jury for the SWR-Bestenliste, a panel of influential literary critics providing a monthly recommended reading list for intellectually inclined television viewers. She remained a Bestenliste jury member for more than ten years. She served between 2004 and 2008 on the jury for the Klagenfurt-based Ingeborg Bachmann Prize. She was also, for a number of years, a member of the Clemens Brentano literary prize jury.

The focus of März's literary interest is primarily on contemporary German language literature, and includes a number of relatively high-profile members of the literary establishment. Among her particular specialities are the works of Wolfgang Hilbig, Wilhelm Genazino, Wilhelm Genazino, Thomas Hürlimann, Ralf Rothmann, Lutz Seiler and Uwe Tellkamp. When it comes to literary context, some of the themes to which März regularly returns in her criticism and other publications are feminism and gender studies, along with the relationship between literary criticism and society more generally.

Ursula März's involvement in literary prizes extended beyond membership various of prize juries. In 1990, she won the Klagenfurt Critics' Award ("Klagenfurter Publizistik-Wettbewerb") for essay writing. She followed this up in 2005 with the Berlin prize for literary criticism, which arrived with a €10,000 bursary, and accompanied by a commendation of her "intelligent interpretations and all-encompassing understanding of literature and the world within which it exists".

März also worked as a court columnist at the Moabit Criminal Court in Berlin . Her experiences as a spectator and journalist in numerous trials found literary expression in her collection of short stories , Almost Criminal: Stories from Everyday Life, published in August 2011.
