= Liza Cody =

English crime fiction writer

Liza Cody (born 11 April 1944, in London) is an English crime fiction writer.

== Career ==
Before she began writing, Cody worked mostly in the visual arts, including as a graphic designer, but she also made furniture and was employed by Madame Tussaud's waxwork museum as a hair inserter and colouring artiste.

Cody launched her first book in 1980. She is, as of 2026, the author of 18 novels and many short stories. Most of her work is set in London. Her Anna Lee series introduced the professional female private detective to mystery fiction. The entire Anna Lee series was loosely adapted for television and broadcast in both the U.K. and the U.S.

Cody is also the author of the Bucket Nut Trilogy, featuring professional wrestler Eva Wylie, as well as the stand-alone novels Rift, Gimme More, Ballad of a Dead Nobody, Miss Terry, Gift or Theft, and The Short-Order Detective. Gimme More and Ballad of a Dead Nobody reflect the author's interest and experience in the world of music and musicians. Miss Terry is a thriller dealing with issues about the children of immigrant families in modern Britain. Gift or Theft is her take on the Gothic novel. Cody has also written a two-book series about a homeless woman: Lady Bag and Crocodiles and Good Intentions: further adventures of Lady Bag. The Short-Order Detective features an ex-London policewoman, Hannah Abram, who is trying to establish herself as a private detective by taking on the small cases that the police ignore. A second Hannah Abram novel, The Hard-Hearted Detective was published in August, 2026.

Cody's novels have been widely translated. Her short stories have appeared in numerous anthologies and magazines. A widely praised collection of her first seventeen was published as Lucky Dip and other stories in 2003, reprinted in 2016. Her stories since then were published as My People and other crime stories in 2021.

== Personal life ==
Since 1999 she has lived in Bath, England. She has a daughter and two grandchildren. She is also a founder member of a small NGO in the Busiiro region of Uganda whose mission is to keep young girls in education instead of early marriage or prostitution.

== Awards and honours ==
Awards include the John Creasey Memorial Prize and the CWA Silver Dagger in the UK as well as an Anthony Award in the U.S. and a Marlowe in Germany. She has twice been nominated for the MWA's Edgars.

== Books ==
The Anna Lee series

- Dupe (1980)
- Bad Company (1982)
- Stalker (1983)
- Head Case (1985)
- Under Contract (1986)
- Backhand (1991)

The Eva Wylie series

- Bucket Nut (1992)
- Monkey Wrench (1994)
- Musclebound (1997)

The Lady Bag books

- Lady Bag (2013)
- Crocodiles and Good Intentions (2018)

Stand alone novels

- Rift (1988, Scribner; Collins in the UK)
- Gimme More (2000, Bloomsbury)
- Ballad of a Dead Nobody (2011)
- Miss Terry (2012)
- Gift or Theft (2020)
- The Short-Order Detective (2024)
- The Hard-Hearted Detective (2026)

Short story collections

- Lucky Dip and other stories (Crippen & Landru, 2003) (CreateSpace, 2016)
- Short story Lucky Dip also published in The International Association of Crime Writers presents Bad Behavior (1995, Gulliver Books, ed Mary Higgins Clark)
- Short story Lucky Dip included in The International Association of Crime Writers presents Bad Behavior (1995, ed Mary Higgins Clark)
  - My People and other crime stories (Gatekeeper Press, 2020)
