= Jean Heysterbach =

Auxiliary Bishop of Augsburg from 1436 to 1447

Most Reverend Jean Heysterbach
- Auxiliary Bishop of Augsburg; Titular Bishop of Adramyttium
- Church: Catholic Church
- Diocese: Augsburg
- In office: 1436 – 1447
- Successor: Wilhelm Mader

Orders
- Consecration: 26 February 1436 by André Dias de Escobar

Personal details
- Died: 1447 Augsburg, Germany

Jean Heysterbach, O.P. (died 1447) was a Roman Catholic prelate who served as Auxiliary Bishop of Augsburg (1436–1447).

== Biography ==
Jean Heysterbach was ordained a priest in the Order of Preachers. On 10 February 1436, he was appointed during the papacy of Pope Eugene IV as Auxiliary Bishop of Augsburg and Titular Bishop of Adramyttium. On 26 February 1436, he was consecrated bishop by André Dias de Escobar, Titular Bishop of Megara, with Laurent de Cardi, Bishop of Sagone, and Giovanni de Bertoldi, Bishop of Fano, serving as co-consecrators. He served as Auxiliary Bishop of Augsburg until his death on 1447.
