= Siegfried IV von Algertshausen =

Bishop of Augsburg from 1286 to 1288

- Prince-Bishop of Augsburg
- Diocese: Augsburg
- In office: 1286 – 1288
- Predecessor: Hartmann of Dillingen
- Successor: Wolfhard I von Roth

Personal details
- Died: 26 June 1288 Augsburg
- Buried: Augsburg Cathedral
- Denomination: Roman Catholic

Siegfried IV von Algertshausen, known as Siegfried von Algertshausen (died 26 June 1288), was the prince-bishop of Augsburg from 1286 until his death.

Siegfried belonged to a local noble family, the lords of Algertshausen. He attended the school at Augsburg Cathedral and became a canon there by 1255. In 1263 he became archdeacon and in 1269 the provost of Buxheim.

In July 1286, he was elected to succeed Hartmann von Dillingen as bishop. He was consecrated at the Synod of Würzburg in March 1287. Shortly before his death, he donated the Pfersee Castle and a watermill to the bishopric. He died in Augsburg on 26 June 1288 and was buried in the Augsburg Cathedral. He left some houses and farms to the cathedral chapter.

== Bibliography ==
- Günther Grünsteudel (1998), Augsburger Stadtlexikon (in German) (Auflage ed.), Perlach-Verlag, p. 818, ISBN 3-922769-28-4
- Augsburger Anzeigenblatt (1855), Erinnerungen aus Augsburgs Vergangenheit (in German)
- Friedrich Zoepfl (1955), Das Bistum Augsburg und seine Bischöfe im Mittelalter (in German), Verlag Schnell & Steiner München und Winfried-Werk Augsburg, pp. 223–227

Catholic Church titles
Preceded by Hartmann of Dillingen	Prince-Bishop of Augsburg; 1286 – 1288	Succeeded by Wolfhard von Roth
