= Henry II of Augsburg =

Bishop of Augsburg from 1047 to 1063

Henri II of Augsburg
- Bishop of Augsburg
- Diocese: Augsburg
- In office: 1047 – 1063
- Predecessor: Eberhard I of Augsburg
- Successor: Embrico of Augsburg

Personal details
- Died: 3 September 1063
- Denomination: Roman Catholic

Henry II of Augsburg (origin and ancestry unknown; died 3 September 1063) was Bishop of Augsburg from 1047 to 1063.

Prior to his episcopal tenure Henry II was a member of the Hofkapelle of Emperor Henry III and, from 1046 to 1047, the head of the Italian chancellery, in which documents that concerned the Italian lands of the Holy Roman Empire were prepared. His career is thus typical of the Ottonian-Salian imperial church. As Bishop of Augsburg, Henry II was responsible for the expansion of Augsburg Cathedral and the episcopal palace.

== Bibliography ==
- Theodor Lindner (1880). "Heinrich II., Bischof von Augsburg" . Allgemeine Deutsche Biographie (in German). Vol. 11. Leipzig: Duncker & Humblot. pp. 450–451.
- Friedrich Zoepfl (1969). "Heinrich II.". Neue Deutsche Biographie (in German). Vol. 8. Berlin: Duncker & Humblot. pp. 336–337. (full text online).

Catholic Church titles
Preceded by Eberhard I	Bishop of Augsburg; 1047 – 1063	Succeeded by Embrico
