= Witgar (bishop of Augsburg) =

Witgar (died 887) was an East Frankish nobleman and monk who served as a royal chaplain under King Louis the German, as Louis's high chancellor in 858–860, as abbot of Ottobeuren from 860, and as bishop of Augsburg from 863 at the latest.

Witgar, being of noble lineage, possessed highly productive estates near Langres in the kingdom of Lotharingia, although his possession was being disputed in 860. His access to these estates and their military value may have been a cause of his promotion to chancellor in 858. He was already by then a professed Benedictine. In June 860, he was present at the conference of the Carolingian dynasts in Koblenz, although noted only as abbot of Ottobeuren. Louis engineered his appointment as bishop sometime between 860 and 863, after which he continued to come to court as an advisor.

Witgar is the namesake and recipient of the Witgar Belt, a silken liturgical cincture given to him and perhaps also made by Queen Emma, probably between 858 and 860. Today it is held by the diocesan museum in Augsburg.

Witgar died in 887 and was buried in Augsburg Cathedral. His verse epitaph was discovered in the 1960s.

== Sources ==
- Bührer-Thierry, Geneviève (1989). "Les évêques de Bavière et d'Alémanie dans l'entourage des derniers rois carolingiens en Germanie (876–911)". Francia. 16 (1): 31–52.
- Garver, Valerie L. (2025). "'Accomplished in the Art of Athena': Carolingian Queens, Textiles, and the Politics of Clothing in the Ninth Century". Speculum. 100 (2): 404–427. doi:10.1086/734442.
- Goldberg, Eric J. (2006a). Struggle for Empire: Kingship and Conflict under Louis the German, 817–876. Cornell University Press.
- Goldberg, Eric J. (2006b). "Regina nitens sanctissima Hemma: Queen Emma (827–876), Bishop Witgar of Augsburg, and the Witgar-Belt". In Björn Weiler; Simon MacLean (eds.). Representations of Power in Medieval Germany, 800–1500. Brepols. pp. 57–95. doi:10.1484/M.IMR-EB.3.3435.
- Kroh, Johannes (2024). "Witgar (Witgarius, Uuitgarius)". Neue Deutsche Biographie (in German). Vol. 28. Berlin: Duncker & Humblot. pp. 306–307. (full text online).
