= Hartmann of Dillingen =

Bishop of Augsburg from 1248 to 1286

- Prince-Bishop of Augsburg
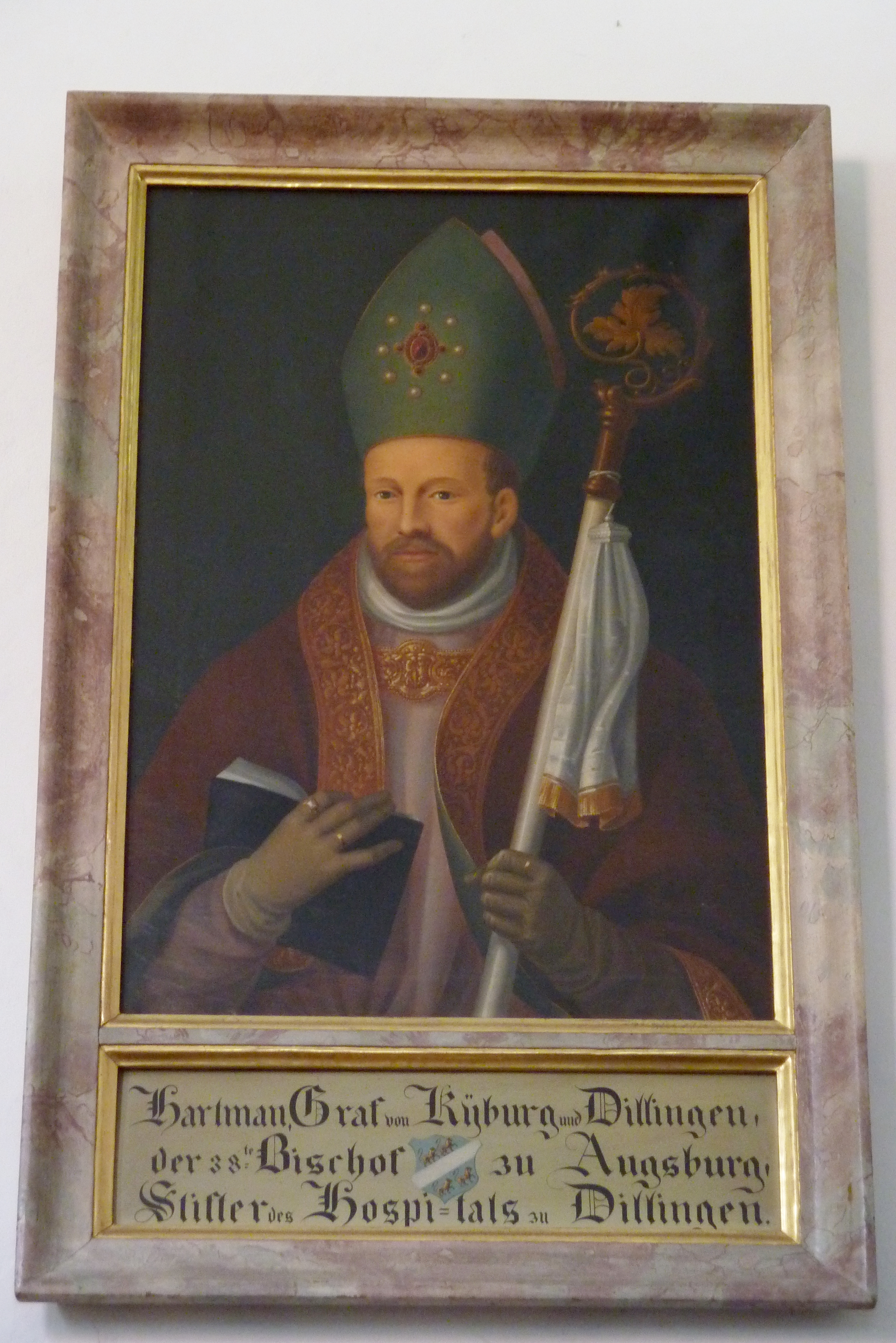
- Bishop Hartmann V, 19th-century painting in the church of the Holy Spirit Hospital in Dillingen an der Donau
- Diocese: Augsburg
- In office: 1248 – 1286
- Predecessor: Siboto of Seefeld
- Successor: Siegfried IV von Algertshausen

Personal details
- Born: Hartmann von Dillingen
- Died: 4 or 5 July 1286
- Buried: Augsburg Cathedral
- Denomination: Roman Catholic

Relief in Dillingen an der Donau

Hartmann of Dillingen (d. 4 or 5 July 1286) was Prince-Bishop of Augsburg from 1248 until his death.

== Background ==
Hartmann was a member of the Swabian noble von Dillingen family, who held territory in the Upper Danube area and the office of Vogt over the city of Ulm. The family provided several bishops, among them Walter I of Augsburg (1133–1152), Eberhard I of Constance, and Ulrich I of Constance.

Hartmann was the youngest son of Count Hartmann IV of Dillingen (d. 1258) and Willibirgis (d. before 1248).

== Life ==
He was involved in the establishment of the hospital in Dillingen in 1237. In 1241, Hartmann and his father, the Count, donated to the Community of Ladies in Dillingen a house near the parish church with one lot of land, a cabbage patch and a meadow. In 1246 or 1247, Hartmann was appointed canon in Augsburg. In 1248, Siboto of Seefeld was deposed as Bishop of Augsburg by Pope Innocent IV and Hartmann was appointed as his successor.

== Bishop ==
Troubles arose between the Prince-Bishop of Augsburg and the city authorities. Augsburg, like other large cities throughout the greater part of Germany, attained enormous wealth, owing to the industrial and commercial activity of the citizens. From time to time efforts were made to restrict as much as possible the ancient civil rights of the bishops and their stewards, and even to abrogate them entirely. "The emperors were interested in Augsburg as a source of political support and revenue. As imperial influence in the city increased, that of the bishops' decreased.

In the power struggle between the House of Hohenstaufen and the pope, Hartmann V support the latter. He was thus seen as an adversary by the citizens, who barred the gates of the city to him when he came to take possession of his see. The bishop retired to his rural estates. From a state of discontent the citizens passed to open violence and burned the chapter house. In 1251 the Franciscans negotiated a peace and wrung a number of concessions for the burghers. It took until 1256 before he was consecrated.

He supported the monasteries and hospitals in his bishopric. He allowed Mendicant order, such as the Franciscans, Dominicans, and Carmelites to provide religious care in his diocese. In 1251 Bishop Hartmann V granted the Dominican sisters of Augsburg land in the parish of Saint Moritz, where the nuns built a new cloister and church.

The coins produced by the episcopal mint were the main currency in an extensive region.

In 1256, a dispute arose between Hartmann V and Louis II, Duke of Bavaria about the office of Vogt in his bishopric. In 1270, he prevailed; however, in 1276, he lost control of the office to the Empire. In a dispute with Count Louis III of Oettingen about the office of Vogt over Neresheim Abbey, an arbitration board chaired by Albertus Magnus ruled against him.

Swigger II of Mindelberg took Hartmann V prisoner in 1266 and burned down his Straßberg castle.

After the death of his brothers, he inherited the family possessions. Some of these were transferred to the Bishopric of Augsburg in 1258. The von Dillingen family died out in the male line with Hartmann V's death in 1286. Hartmann V bequeathed to the Church of Augsburg his paternal inheritance, including the town and castle of Dillingen.

He was buried before the altar in Augsburg Cathedral.

== See also ==
- Counts of Dillingen

== Bibliography ==
- Joachim Jahn: Dillingen, Hartmann von, in: Karl Bosl (ed.): Bayerische Biographie, vol. 1, Pustet, Regensburg 1983, p. 143 Online
- Manfred Weitlauff (2001), Erwin Gatz (ed.), Hartmann, Graf von Dillingen, Die Bischöfe des Heiligen Römischen Reiches 1198 bis 1448, Berlin: Duncker & Humblot, pp. 9–12, ISBN 3-428-10303-3

Catholic Church titles
Preceded by Siboto of Seefeld	Prince-Bishop of Augsburg; 1248 – 1286	Succeeded by Siegfried IV von Algertshausen
