= Giovanni da Serravalle =

Sammarinese Franciscan and humanist

Most Reverend Giovanni de Bertoldi
- Bishop of Fano
- Church: Catholic Church
- Diocese: Diocese of Fano
- In office: 1417–1445
- Successor: Giovanni di Renzo de Tonsis

Personal details
- Died: 15 February 1445 Fano, Italy

Giovanni da Serravalle, also known as Giovanni de Bertoldi (c. 1350 – 1445), was a Sammarinese Franciscan and humanist, who became bishop of Fermo and bishop of Fano (1417–1445). He is now best known for his commentary on Dante.

== Life ==
Giovanni de Bertoldi was ordained a priest in the Order of Friars Minor.

In 1385 he was lector at the studium of St. Croce. From 1387 to 1390 he taught moral philosophy at the University of Pavia. He taught arts at the University of Perugia for a year from 1400. He was appointed bishop of Fermo by Pope Gregory XII, around 1410. On 15 Dec 1417, he was appointed during the papacy of Pope Martin V as Bishop of Fano. He served as Bishop of Fano until he died there on 15 Feb 1445.

While bishop, he was the Principal Co-Consecrator Jean Heysterbach, Auxiliary Bishop of Augsburg (1436).

== Works ==
During the Council of Constance he translated the Divine Comedy into Latin. He did this largely for the benefit of Nicholas Bubwith and Robert Hallam, English bishops attending the council; he was encouraged by Amedeo Saluzzo attending the council, who was a cardinal of the Avignon obedience. Serraville was also a source for stories concerning the young Dante's visits to Paris and Oxford. He lectured at Constance on Dante too, producing later a written commentary. It was strongly influenced by Benvenuto da Imola and Stefano Talice da Ricaldone; and Serravalle revised Benvenuto's glosses, to support the council's reforming programme.

Digital Editions:

- de Serravalle, Iohannes (28 April 2026). Translatio et commentum totius libri Dantis Aldighierii. Verba. Ex Officina Elsa.
- de Serravalle, Iohannes (28 April 2026). Translatio et commentum totius libri Dantis Aldighierii. Italiano et Latine. Ex Officina Elsa.
- de Serravalle, Iohannes (3 May 2026). Translatio et commentum totius libri Dantis Aldighierii. La Commedia Colorata. Ex Officina Elsa.
- de Serravalle, Iohannes (3 May 2026). Translatio et commentum totius libri Dantis Aldighierii. Italiano et Lagine. La Commedia Colorata. Ex Officina Elsa.

== External links and additional sources ==
- Serravalle's Latin translation of and commentary on the Commedia
- Cheney, David M. "Diocese of Fano-Fossombrone-Cagli-Pergola". Catholic-Hierarchy.org. (for Chronology of Bishops) ^{[self-published]}
- Chow, Gabriel. "Diocese of Fano-Fossombrone-Cagli-Pergola". GCatholic.org. (for Chronology of Bishops) ^{[self-published]}

Catholic Church titles
Preceded by	Bishop of Fano; 1417–1445	Succeeded by Giovanni di Renzo de Tonsis
