= Antonio Severini =

Most Reverend Antonio Severini
- Church: Catholic Church
- Diocese: Diocese of Gubbio
- In office: 1444–1472

Personal details
- Died: 4 April 1472 Gubbio, Italy

Antonio Severini (died 1472) was a Roman Catholic prelate who served as Bishop of Gubbio (1444–1472) and Bishop of Cagli (1439–1444).

== Biography ==
On 14 Dec 1439, Antonio Severini was appointed during the papacy of Pope Eugene IV as Bishop of Cagli. On 15 Jul 1444, he was appointed during the papacy of Pope Eugene IV as Bishop of Gubbio. He served as Bishop of Gubbio until his death on 4 Apr 1472. While bishop, he was the principal co-consecrator of Wilhelm Mader, Auxiliary Bishop of Augsburg (1447); and André da Mule, Archbishop of Bar (1448).

== External links and additional sources ==
- Cheney, David M. "Diocese of Cagli e Pergola". Catholic-Hierarchy.org.^{self-published}
- Chow, Gabriel. "Diocese of Cagli". GCatholic.org.^{self-published}

Catholic Church titles
Preceded by	Bishop of Cagli; 1439–1444	Succeeded by Simone Pauli
Preceded by	Bishop of Gubbio; 1444–1472	Succeeded by
