= Maximilian von Lingg =

Bishop of Augsburg from 1248 to 1286

- Bishop of Augsburg
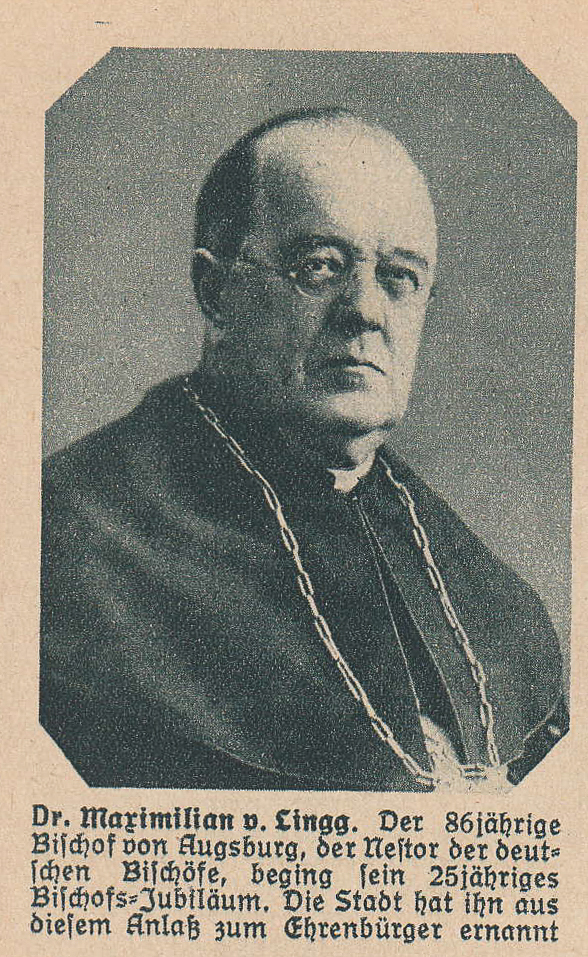
- Church: Roman Catholic
- Diocese: Augsburg
- In office: 20 July 1902 – 31 May 1930
- Predecessor: Petrus von Hötzl
- Successor: Joseph Kumpfmüller

Orders
- Ordination: 22 July 1865 (priest)

Personal details
- Born: 8 March 1842 Nesselwang
- Died: 31 May 1930 (aged 88) Füssen
- Buried: Augsburg Cathedral
- Coat of arms

Maximilian von Lingg, from 1902 Ritter von Lingg (8 March 1842 in Nesselwang – 31 May 1930 in Füssen), was the 78th Bishop of Augsburg.

== Life ==
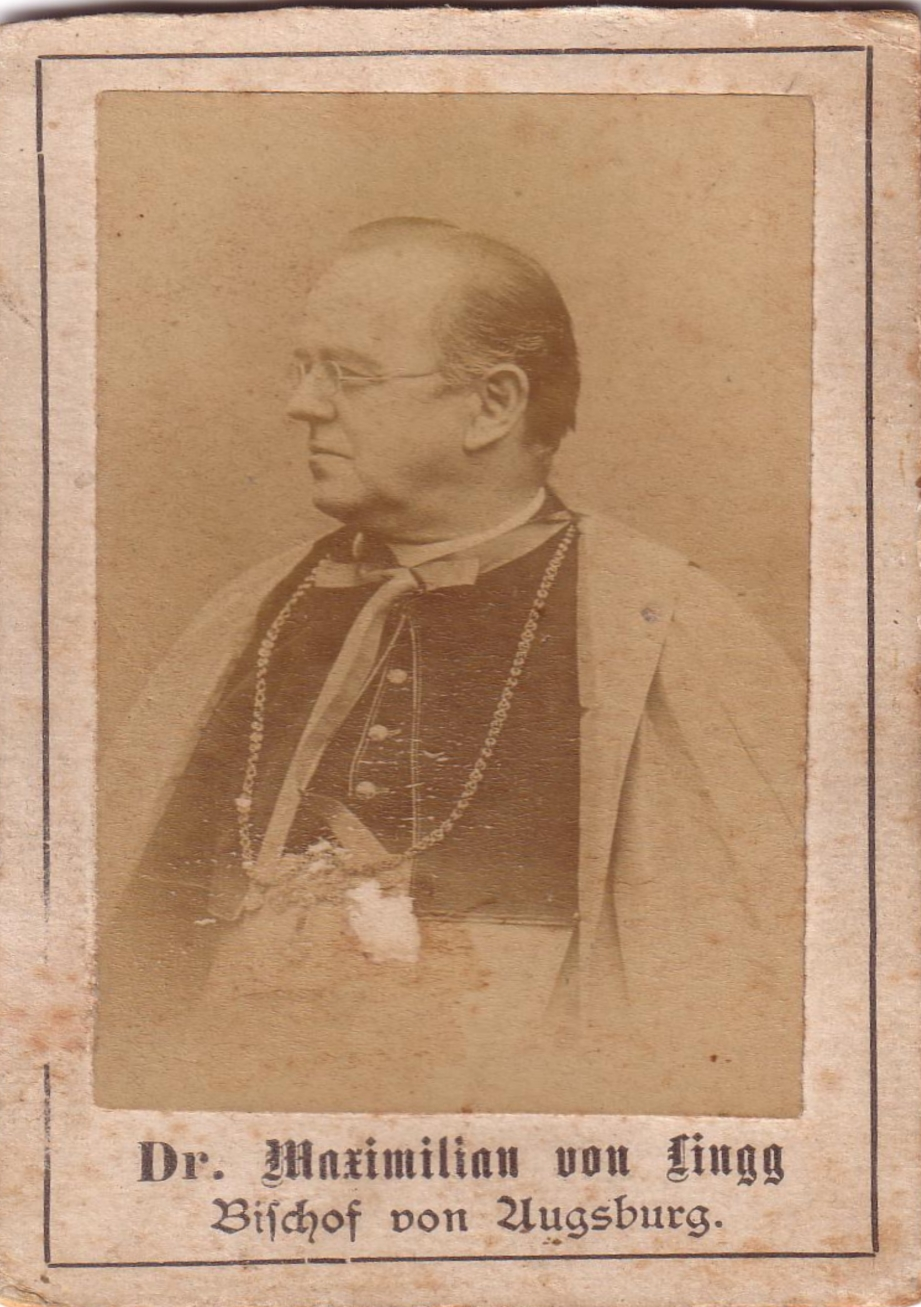
Maximilian v. Lingg

Max Joseph Lingg was born on 8 March 1842, the eldest child of the baker Johann Georg Lingg and his wife Franziska (née Pfanner), in Nesselwang, in the German district today called Ostallgäu. His mother was a relative of the Trappist abbot Franz Pfanner, and Max Joseph was himself a cousin of the epic poet Hermann Lingg. After attending the Nesselwang elementary school, the local pastor Heine lobbied for Max Joseph to attend high school at St. Stephan's in Augsburg, and later to study for the priesthood. In 1861 he began his study of theology in Munich, where he also had contact with the conservative sect known as the "Old Catholics" (Altkatholiken). During his studies from 1861, he was a member of the Munich fraternity Algovia. Lingg remained in this fraternity for 38 years, despite his high ecclesiastical offices in Bamberg, and resigned only three years before his appointment as bishop in 1898 because of "increasing liberalisation" of Fraternities. With the beginning of the winter semester 1863/1864 he went to the Pontifical Gregorian University (the Gregoriana) in Rome. Throughout this period he published lyrical works. On 22 July 1865, he was ordained a priest in Munich and celebrated his primacy on 27 August at the St. Mang Church in Füssen.

By 1863 Max Joseph had begun a second degree in law, which he completed in 1869 with a doctorate on the topic of the education of King Alfonso XII of Spain. From Spain and through various Bavarian princes, he became a protégé of members of the House of Wittelsbach, through which he was in 1874 named professor of church history and church law at the State Lyceum of Bamberg (today incorporated into the University of Bamberg). In 1877 he was promoted to the Privy Council, and later to Monseigneur, by the Archbishop of Bamberg Friedrich von Schreiber. During this time he received his doctorate in theology from the University of Tübingen based on various theological writings. In 1893 Lingg became the provost of the Bamberg Cathedral], requiring him to give up teaching. Despite what was seen in reactionary Bamberg as his comparatively liberal time as a student, he was able to assert himself and in 1902 was appointed Bishop of Augsburg by Luitpold, Prince Regent of Bavaria. On 25 October 1902, shortly after his appointment as bishop, Lingg was awarded the Order of Merit of the Bavarian Crown. Thus elevated to knighthood, he assumed the ceremonial title of "Ritter von Lingg".

== Bishop of Augsburg ==
Lingg's episcopal consecration was conferred on 20 July 1902, by the Archbishop of Munich and Freising, Franz Joseph von Stein.

Lingg spent 28 years attending to his priestly and pastoral duties. He expanded the diocese by increasing the deaneries from forty to sixty, and in 1910 founded the Dillinger seminary as well as several new churches, among them the modern Sacred Heart of Jesus Cathedral in Augsburg. He also campaigned for social organizations such as Caritas and the Catholic Women's League.

The end of the empire in 1919 led to great difficulties for the monarchist Lingg. After the assassination of the Bavarian Prime Minister Kurt Eisner, there was a raid on the episcopal palace, which he barely escaped. He was forced to hide until the end of the Soviet Republic in the St. Ottilien Archabbey. After that, his work fell off sharply. In 1927 he received an honorary citizenship in Augsburg.

Lingg died in 1930 after a working trip to the pension home Ulrichsheim, which he founded on his former parental estate in the Füssen district of Bad Faulenbach. Today the guest house Saint Ulrich includes the church of St. Max, which he donated in 1915 on the occasion of his 50th anniversary in the priesthood. After his death, Bishop Lingg was carried in a festive funeral procession to Augsburg, and buried according to his will under a simple grave plate in the Saint Gertruden chapel in Augsburg Cathedral.

== Bibliography ==
- StadtGottes magazine September 1927
- Helge Dvorak - Biographisches Lexikon der Deutschen Burschenschaft, Band I - Politiker, Teilband 8 - Supplement L–Z, Winter, Heidelberg 2014 ISBN 978-3-8253-6051-1, S. 30–32.
- Engelbert Maximilian Buxbaum (1985). "Lingg, Maximilian Ritter von". Neue Deutsche Biographie (in German). Vol. 14. Berlin: Duncker & Humblot. pp. 624–625. (full text online).
- Manfred Berger [in German] (2007). "Lingg, Maximilian (Max Joseph) Ritter von". In Bautz, Traugott (ed.). Biographisch-Bibliographisches Kirchenlexikon (BBKL) (in German). Vol. 28. Nordhausen: Bautz. cols. 1028–1040. ISBN 978-3-88309-413-7.

== Links ==
- Literature by and about Maximilian von Lingg in the German National Library catalogue
- Eintrag über Maximilian von Lingg auf catholic-hierarchy.org (englisch) ^{[self-published]}

Catholic Church titles
Preceded by Petrus von Hötzl	Bishop of Augsburg; 1902 – 1930	Succeeded by Joseph Kumpfmüller
