= Basilica of Sts. Peter and Paul, Dillingen =

Coordinates: 48°34′41″N 10°29′38″E

Basilica of Sts. Peter and Paul
- Basilika SS. Peter und Paul
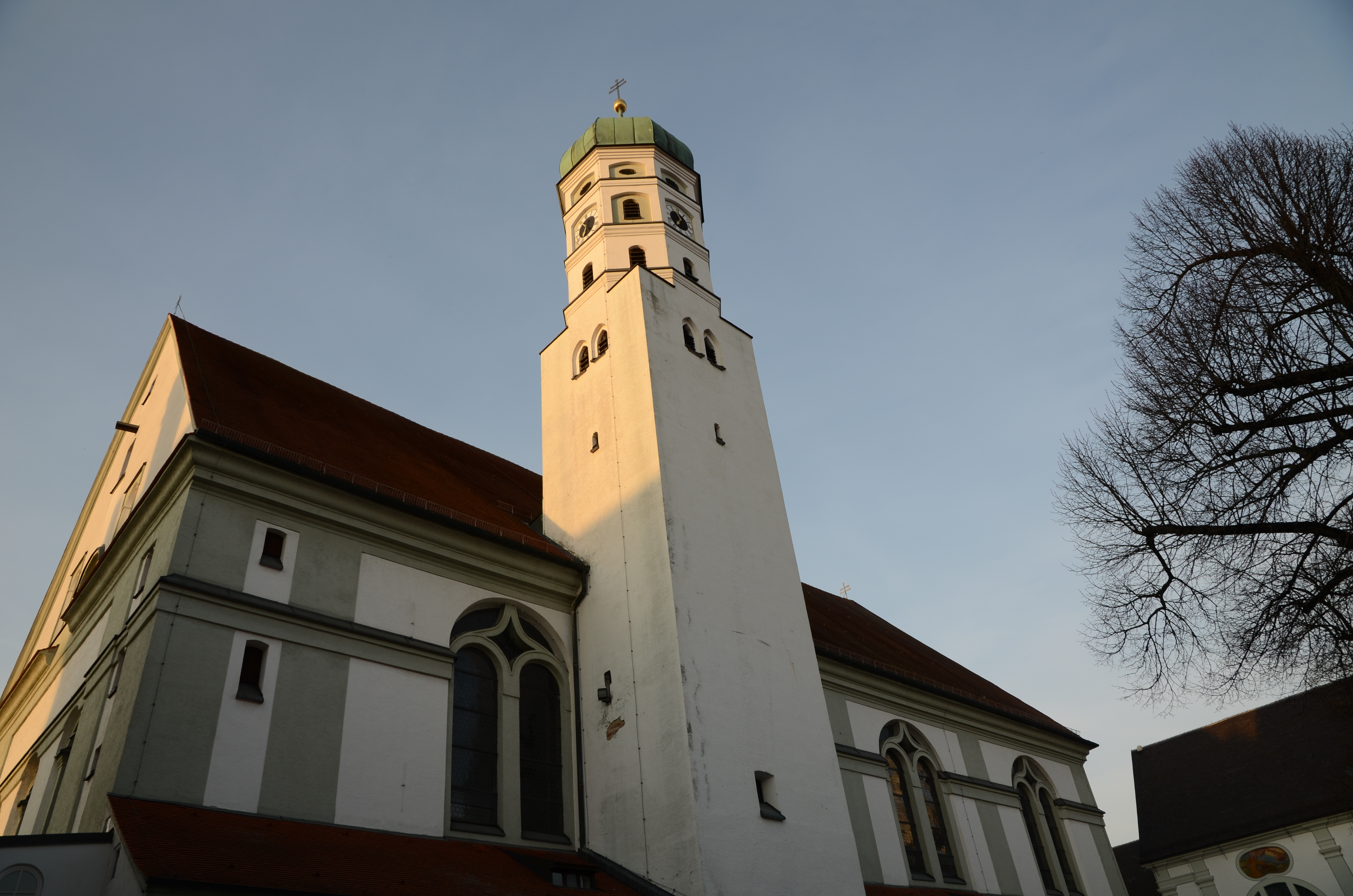

- Location within Bavaria Location within Germany
- Location: Dillingen, Bavaria
- Country: Germany
- Denomination: Roman Catholic Church

The Basilica of Sts. Peter and Paul (German: Basilika SS. Peter und Paul ) also called Dillingen Basilica is a Catholic church located in Dillingen, Germany, which serves as basilica and co-cathedral of the diocese of Augsburg.

The three-nave church was built in the years 1619–1628 by court architect Hans Alberthal on the foundations of the earlier churches dating from the thirteenth and fifteenth centuries. The church is 54.8 meters long, 22.3 meters high and 22 meters wide. Due to the damages suffered during the Thirty Years' War, in 1643 its structure was renewed. With the addition of the tower in 1669, the church reached 49 meters in height.

After the dissolution of the monastery in 1803 the church became a parish church and in 1979 the church was elevated to the dignity of a minor basilica by Pope John Paul II.

== See also ==
- Roman Catholicism in Germany

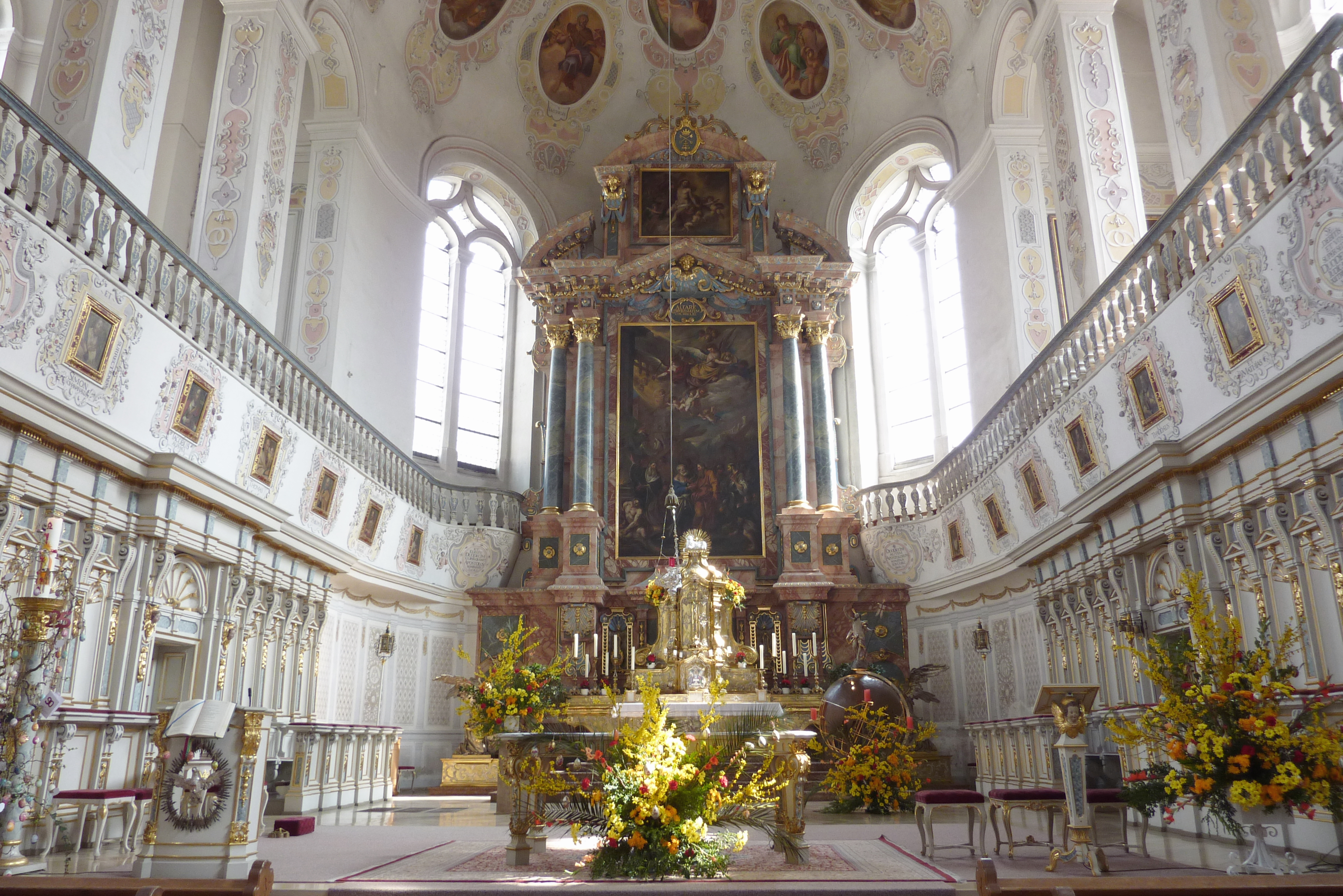
Internal view
