= Michael von Deinlein =

Bishop of Augsburg from 1856 to 1858

- Bishop of Augsburg
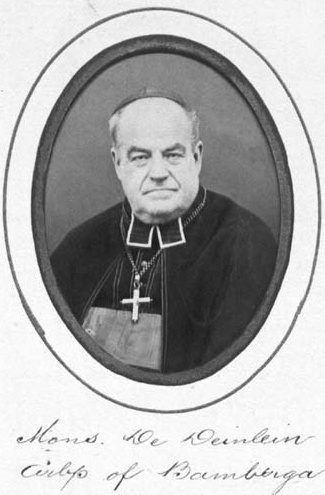
- Michael von Deinlein, official photograph from the Konzilsväter album, 1870
- Diocese: Augsburg
- In office: 12 January 1856 – 17 June 1858
- Predecessor: Johann Peter von Richarz
- Successor: Pankratius von Dinkel

Personal details
- Born: 26 October 1800 Hetzles
- Died: 4 January 1875 (aged 74) Bamberg
- Denomination: Roman Catholic

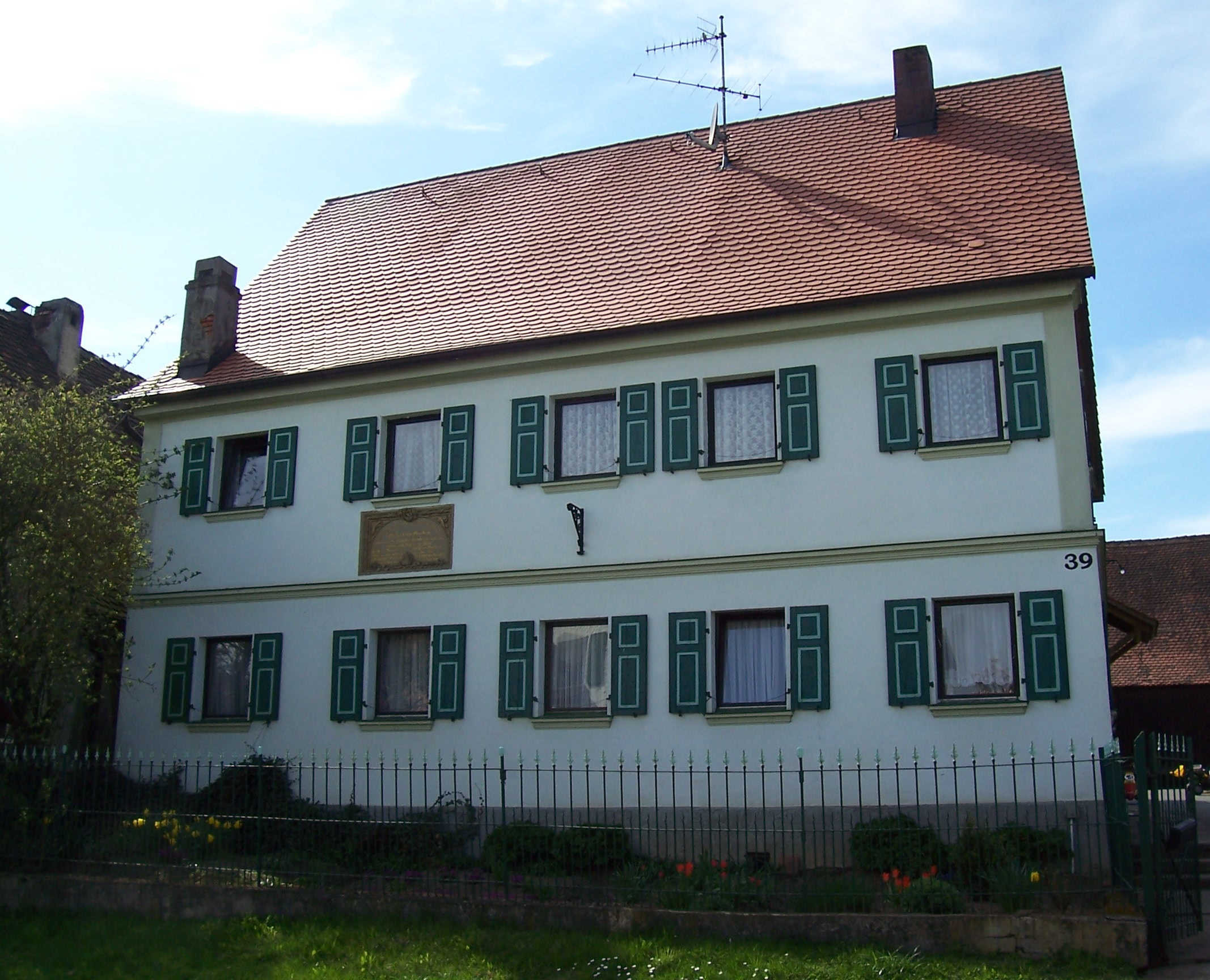
Michael von Deinlein's birthplace

Michael von Deinlein (26 October 1800, Hetzles, Upper Franconia – 4 January 1875, Bamberg) was a German Roman Catholic priest, bishop and archbishop.

== Life ==
He studied theology and philosophy in Bamberg and was ordained a priest on 18 November 1824. He then became a cathedral chaplain and assistant pastor from 1827 to 1830 in Coburg, among other roles. He later became regent and professor of moral theology at the Lyzeum in Bamberg.

In 1841 he became a canon and in 1844 vicar general. In 1853 pope Pius IX made him an auxiliary bishop in Bamberg and titular bishop of Adramyttium. He was ordained bishop on 20 November 1853 by Karl-August von Reisach. From 1851 to 1856 he chaired the Bamberg Historical Society.

In 1856 he became bishop of Augsburg and was awarded the Order of Merit of the Bavarian Crown. In 1858 he became archbishop of Bamberg, a role he held until his death. He hosted the nineteenth Katholikentag in Bamberg from 31 August to 3 September 1868. He opposed the dogma of papal infallibility at the First Vatican Council from 1869 to 1870, but left the council of bishops early to avoid having to vote on the matter.

== Notes and references ==
Catholic Church titles
Preceded by Johann Peter von Richarz	Bishop of Augsburg; 1856–1858	Succeeded by Pankratius von Dinkel
