= Saint Afra =

Christian martyr (died 304)

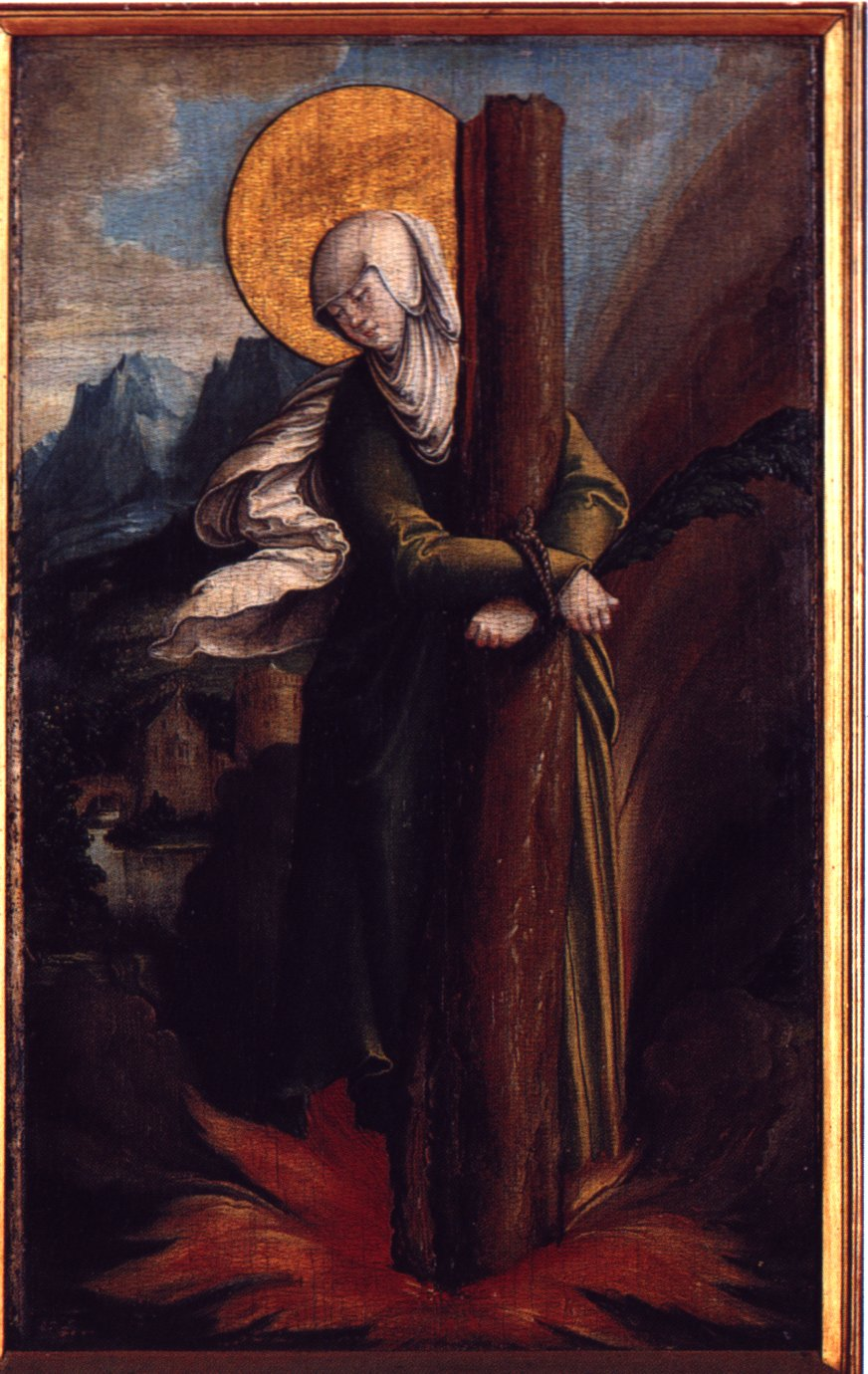
- Saint Afra, by the Master of Messkirch, c. 1535–1540

Martyr
- Born: Augsburg, Rhaetia, Roman Empire
- Died: c. 304; Augsburg, Rhaetia, Roman Empire
- Venerated in: Roman Catholic Church, Eastern Orthodox Church
- Major shrine: St. Ulrich's and St. Afra's Abbey, Augsburg
- Feast: August 7 (sometimes listed as August 5)
- Attributes: depicted being burnt to death
- Patronage: Augsburg; converts; martyrs; penitent women

Saint Afra (died 304) was martyred during the Diocletian persecution. Along with Saint Ulrich & St Simpert, she is a patron saint of Augsburg. Her feast day is August 7. Afra was dedicated to the service of the goddess Venus by her mother, Hilaria. Through his teachings, Bishop Narcissus converted Afra and her family to Christianity. When it was learned that Afra was a Christian, she was brought before Diocletian and ordered to sacrifice to the pagan gods. She refused and was condemned to death by fire.

== Biography ==
Although many different accounts of her life exist, the most widely known is The Acts of St. Afra, which dates from the Carolingian period (8th century AD). In the opinion of most critics, this is a compilation of two different accounts, the story of the conversion of St. Afra, and the story of her martyrdom. The former is of later origin and is merely a legendary narrative of Carolingian times, drawn up with the intention of connecting with St. Afra the organization of the church of Augsburg.

In the late 3rd century, her pagan family journeyed from Cyprus to Augsburg. Afra was dedicated to the service of the goddess Venus by her mother, Hilaria. According to this source, she was originally a prostitute in Augsburg, having gone there from Cyprus, maybe even as the daughter of the King of Cyprus. She is reputed either to have run a brothel in that town or worked as a hierodule in the Temple of Venus. As the persecution of Christians during the reign of Roman Emperor Diocletian began, Bishop Narcissus of Girona sought refuge in Augsburg and lodged with Afra and her mother, Hilaria. Through his teachings, Bishop Narcissus converted Afra and her family to Christianity.

She continued to hide the bishop from the authorities. When it was learned that Afra was a Christian, she was brought before Diocletian and ordered to sacrifice to the pagan gods. She refused and was condemned to death by fire on a small island in the Lech River, with her remains being buried at a distance from the place of her martyrdom. Her mother and her maids (viz., Ligna, Eunonia, and Eutropia) later suffered the same fate, for interring her in a burial vault.

According to an alternative account in an earlier document, Afra was beheaded, rather than having been burned. The Martyrologium Hieronymianum (a compilation of martyrs) mentions that Afra "suffered in the city of Augsburg" and was "buried there". Her feast day is August 5.

According to Carl Egger, it appears that the author of the passio blended the account of Afra with that of Venerea, a martyr of Antioch, who is mentioned on the same day in the Martyrologium Hieronymianum. Contrary to this, other ancient calendars portray Afra as a virgin.

== Legacy ==
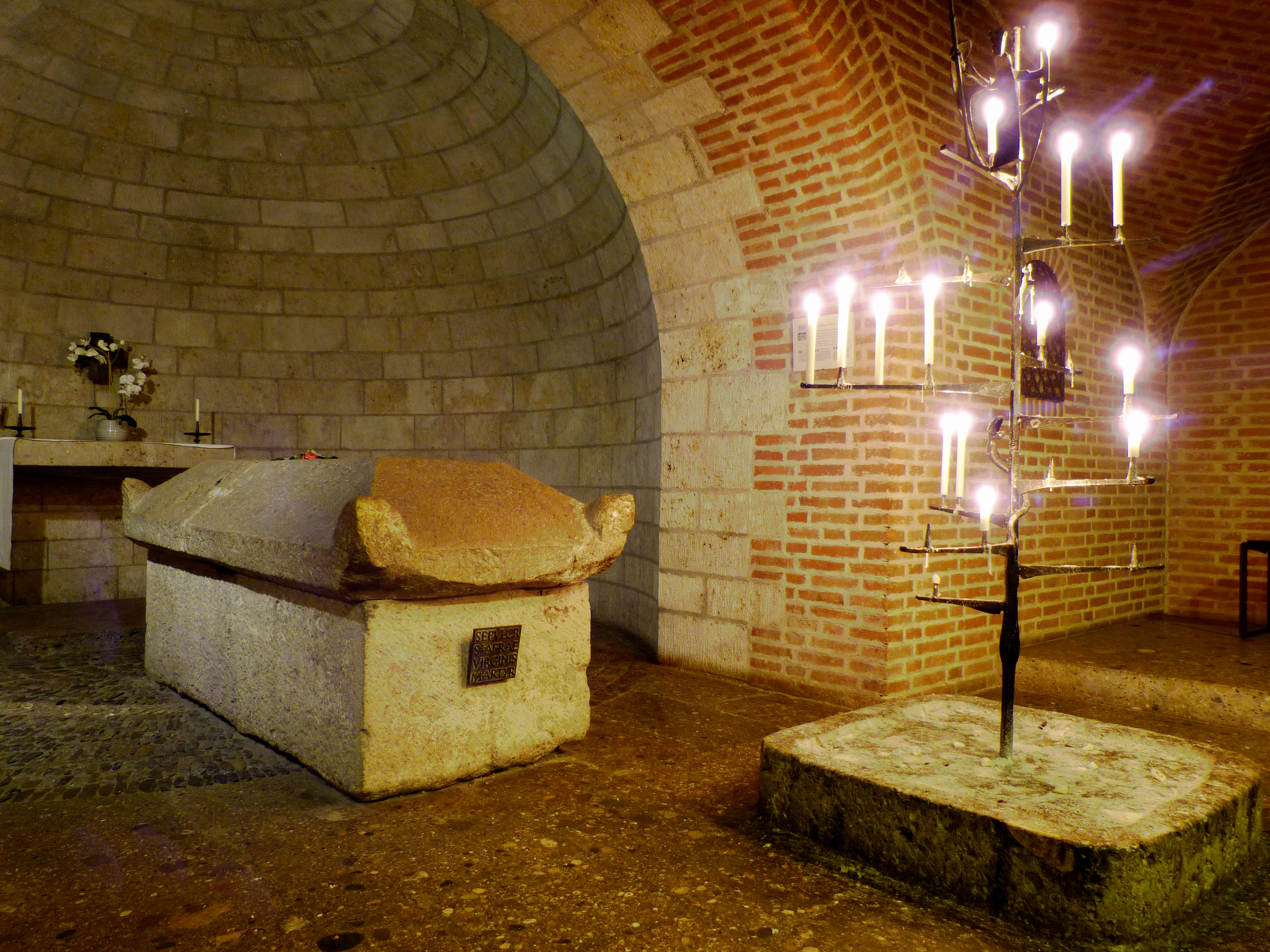
Tomb of Saint Afra in Augsburg

St. Ulrich's and St. Afra's Abbey, Augsburg (German: Kloster Sankt Ulrich und Afra Augsburg) is a former Benedictine abbey dedicated to Saint Ulrich and Saint Afra in the south of the old city in Augsburg, Bavaria. From the medieval Saint Afra's church in Meissen, the name passed via a former monastery of the Canons Regular to the current Sächsisches Landesgymnasium Sankt Afra zu Meißen, a boarding school in Saxony.

Her exact birthdate is unknown.

There was a Church of Saint Afra in Brescia (that was destroyed during the bombing of World War II).

== See also ==
- Saint Afra, patron saint archive
