= Ulrich of Augsburg =

Bishop of Augsburg from 923 to 973

Saint Ulrich of Augsburg
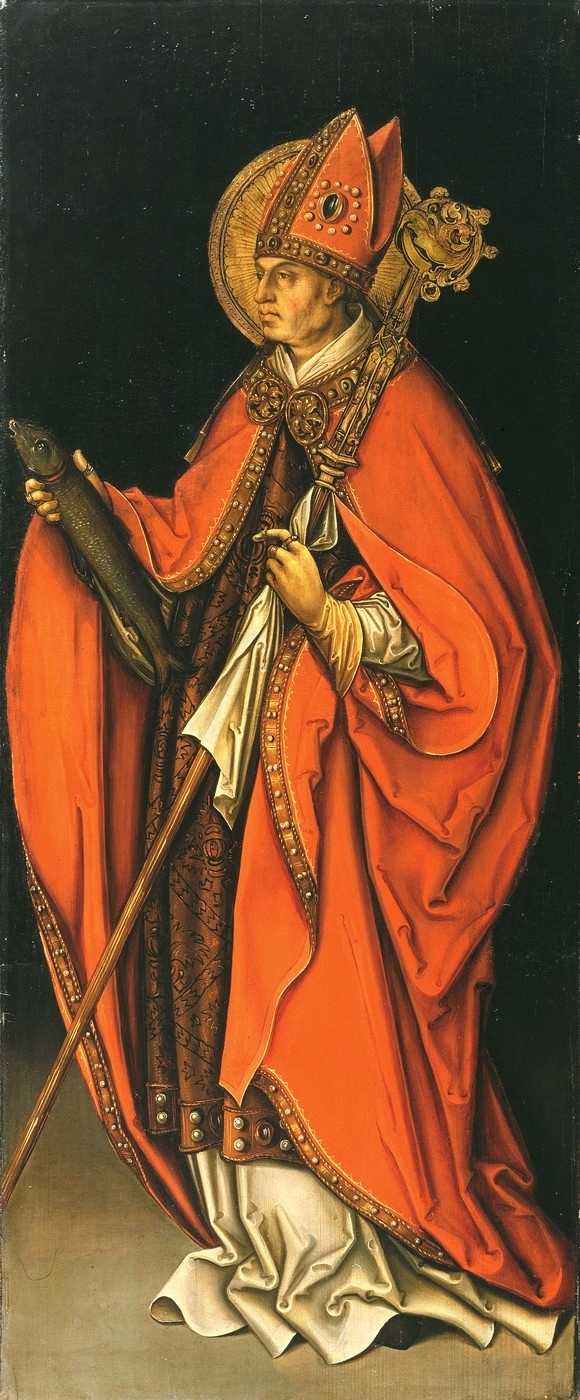
- Oil painting by Leonhard Beck

Bishop of Augsburg Confessor
- Born: 890; Kyburg, now Switzerland
- Died: 4 July 973 (aged 82 or 83); Augsburg, Holy Roman Empire
- Venerated in: Eastern Orthodox Church; Catholic Church
- Canonized: 4 July 993 by Pope John XV
- Feast: 4 July
- Attributes: Bishop holding a fish; at dinner with Saint Wolfgang; rewarding a messenger with a goose leg, which turns into a fish on Friday morning; giving a garment to a beggar; with Saint Afra; riding through a river on horseback as his companion sinks; with a cross given him by an angel
- Patronage: Against birth complications; against faintness; against fever; against mice and moles; diocese of Augsburg, Germany; happy death; weavers; San Dorligo della Valle

Ulrich of Augsburg (890 – 4 July 973), sometimes spelled Uodalric or Odalrici, was Prince-Bishop of Augsburg in the Holy Roman Empire. He was the first saint to be canonised not by a local authority but by a pope.

== Life ==
=== Early years ===
Much of the information concerning Ulrich is derived from the Life of St Ulrich written by Gerhard of Augsburg sometime between 982 and 993. Ulrich was born in 890 at Kyburg in present-day canton of Zürich in Switzerland. He was the son of Hupald, Count of Dillingen (d. 909) and Dietpirch of Swabia (also known as Theoberga). His maternal grandfather was Adalbert II the Illustrious, Count of Thurgau. His family was connected with the dukes of Alamannia and the Ottonian dynasty. An unnamed sister served as a nun in Buchau.

As was customary, his parents presented him as an oblate to the church while he was still a child. A sickly child, at the age of seven he was sent to the monastery of St. Gall, where he proved to be an excellent scholar. While there, he became friends with Wiborada – a recluse living near the monastery – who then foretold that her young friend was destined to become a bishop. He resolved to enter the priesthood but was in doubt whether to enter the Benedictine Abbey of St. Gall or to become a secular priest. Sometime before April 910, he was sent for further training to a kinsman, Adalbero von Augsburg, Bishop of Augsburg, who made him chamberlain. Upon Adalbero's death (28 April 910) Ulrich returned home. The Duke of Swabia presented him at the court of Henry the Fowler, where Ulrich became one of the household retainers.

=== Bishop of Augsburg ===
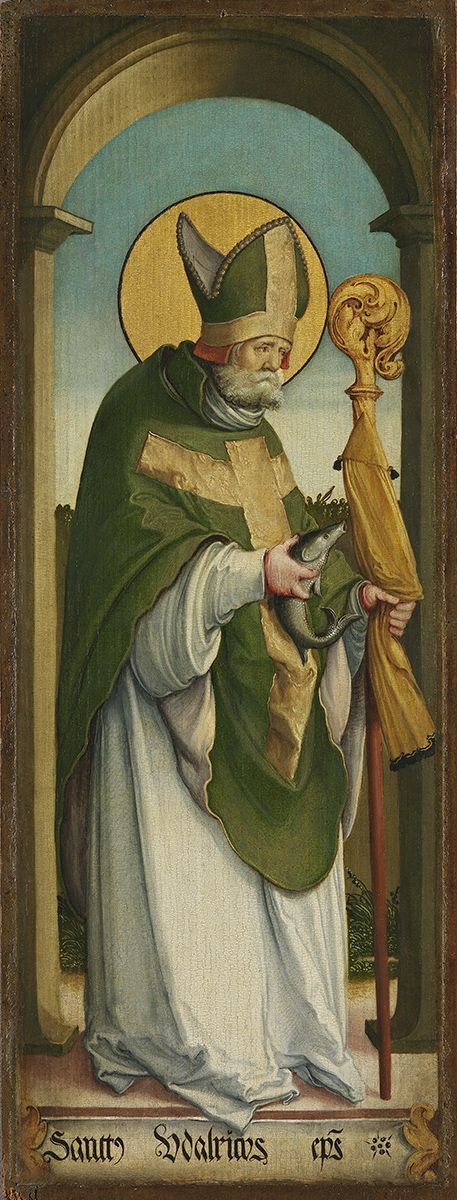
Left wing of an altar: St. Ulrich by the Master of Messkirch (1535 and 1540)

Through the influence of his maternal uncle, Burchard II, Duke of Swabia, and other relatives, Ulrich was appointed bishop of Augsburg by Henry the Fowler and was consecrated on 28 December 923. He sought to improve the low moral and social condition of the clergy. The See of Augsburg reached the period of its greatest splendor under Ulrich; he raised the standard of training and discipline among the clergy by the reformation of existing schools and the establishment of new ones, and by canonical visitations and synods; he provided for the poor, and rebuilt decayed churches and monasteries. He built churches in honor of Saint Afra and Saint John and founded the monastery of St. Stephen for Benedictine nuns. For purposes of obtaining relics he went on two journeys to Rome, in 910, and in 952 or 953. German emperor Otto the Great granted Ulrich the right to mint coins.

During the struggle between Otto and his son Liudolf, Duke of Swabia, Ulrich remained loyal to Otto, holding for him the castle of Schwabmünchen, which was within the territorial jurisdiction of the bishop of Augsburg. When in the summer of 954 father and son were ready to attack each other at Illertissen in Swabia, at the last moment Ulrich and Bishop Hartbert of Chur were able to mediate between Otto and Liudolf. Ulrich succeeded in persuading Liudolf and Conrad, Duke of Lorraine, Otto's son-in-law, to ask the king's pardon on 17 December 954.

=== Against the Magyars ===
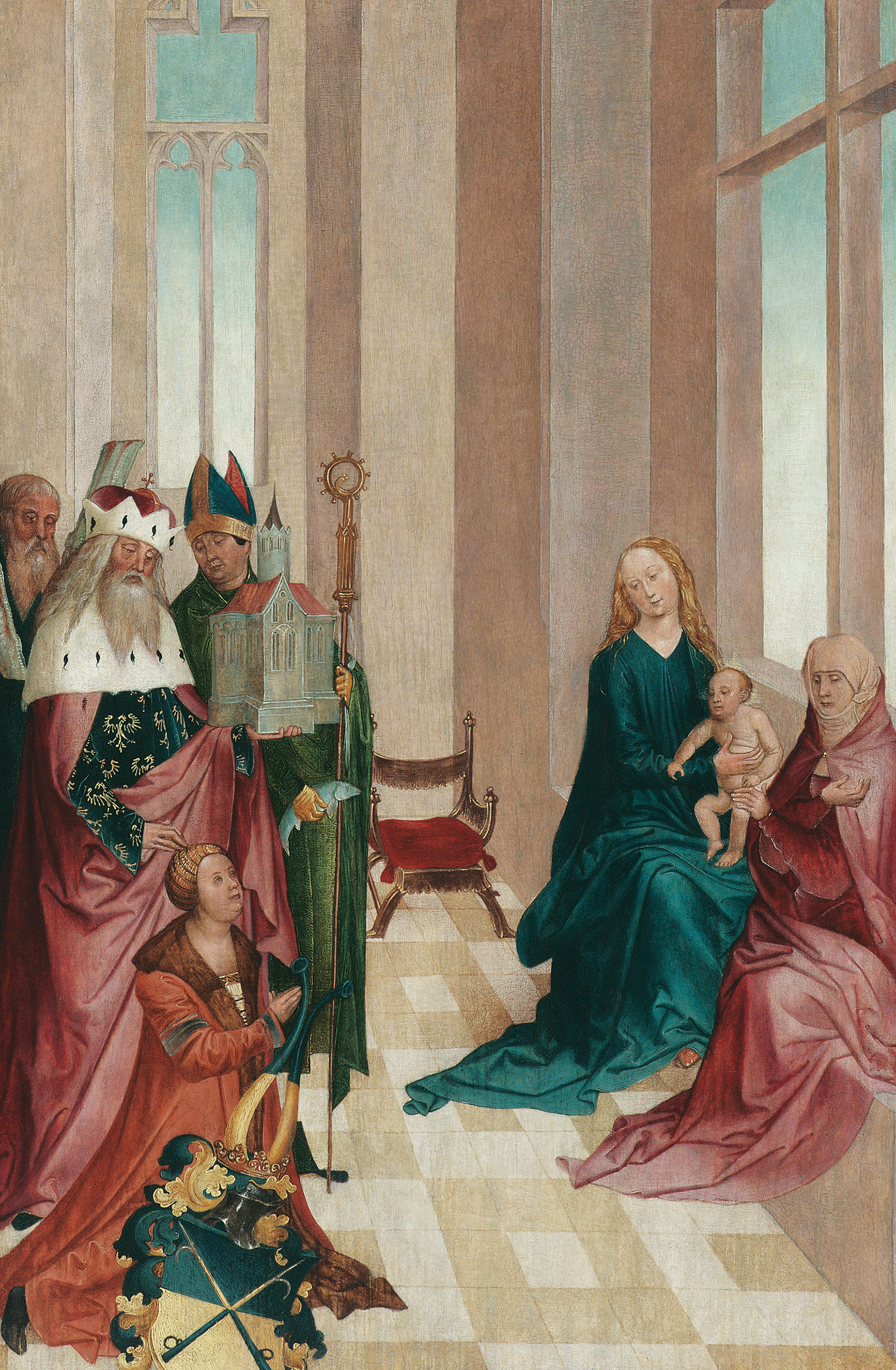
Votive tablet depicting the Virgin and Child with Saint Anne and Saint Leopold, Ulrich and Andrew by Rueland Frueauf the Younger

Magyars repeatedly attacked in the territories of Bavaria and Swabia. Ulrich served as general in the defense of Augsburg. He built a stone wall fortification around the city. During these attacks many churches and buildings were destroyed, which Ulrich later rebuilt. Ulrich attended several imperial meetings and synods, such as at Ingelheim in 948, Augsburg in 952, Rome in 972 and again at Ingelheim in 972.

Soon after, the Magyars entered Germany, plundering and burning as they went, and in 955 advanced as far as Augsburg, which they besieged. It was due to Ulrich's ability and courage that Augsburg was able to hold out against the besiegers until Emperor Otto arrived. According to his biographer Gerhard, Bishop Ulrich took the lead in the defense of the city. On the first day of the attack, Bishop Ulrich rode out to encourage the towns' soldiers in their defense of the city's gate. While the battle raged, the bishop, dressed in his ecclesiastical robes, inspired his men, with the 23rd Psalm ("Yea, though I walk through the valley of the shadow of death"). While this defense was going on, the king was raising an army to march south. The fiercest fighting probably took place on 8 August 955 at the eastern gate, which the Hungarians tried to storm in large numbers. The bishop's men defended the gate bravely and killed the leader of the attack, forcing the Hungarians to withdraw. That evening Ulrich returned to the city to direct throughout the night the repair and strengthening of its walls. The next day the Hungarians launched a wider general attack. During the battle, Berchtold of Risinesburg arrived, which heralded the approach of the German army. At the end of the day, the siege was suspended. Ulrich's ability to hold out during the siege bought precious time for the emperor.

Ulrich subsequently contributed much to the decisive victory at the Battle of Lechfeld (10 August 955), where the invaders were finally defeated. However, Ulrich Schmid maintains that "The later assertion that Ulrich himself took part in the battle is incorrect".

== His character ==
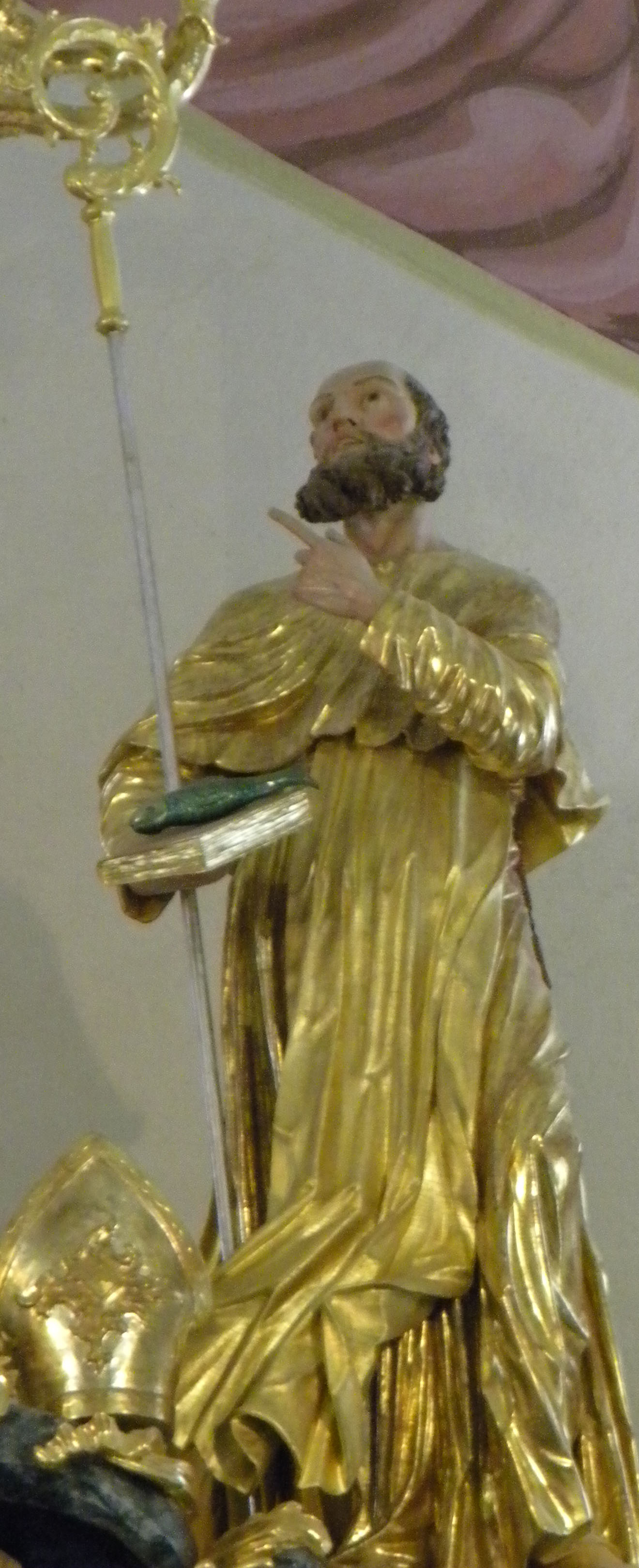
Statue of S. Ulrich in a church in Gora Oljka (Slovenia)

Ulrich demanded a high moral standard of himself and others. A hundred years after his death, a letter apparently written by him, which opposed celibacy, and supported the marriage of priests, suddenly appeared. The forger of the letter counted on the opinion of the common people, who would regard celibacy as unjust if Ulrich, known for the rigidity of his morals, upheld the marriage of priests. Ulrich was also steadfastly loyal, as a prince of the empire, to the emperor. He was one of the most important props of the Ottonian policy, which rested mainly upon the ecclesiastical princes. He constantly attended the judicial courts held by the king and in the Imperial Diets.

== Later life ==
Ulrich took part in the Diet held on 20 September 972, when he defended himself against the charge of nepotism in regard to his nephew Adalbero, whom he had appointed his coadjutor on account of his own illness and desire to retire to a Benedictine abbey. Ulrich did, in fact, resign as prince-bishop and retired to Ottobeuren Abbey, where he became abbot.

As morning dawned on 4 July 973, Ulrich had ashes strewn on the ground in the shape of a cross; the cross sprinkled with holy water, and he was placed upon it. His nephew Richwin came with a message and greeting from Emperor Otto II as the sun rose, and immediately upon this, while the clergy sang the Litany, Ulrich died. He was buried at the St. Afra church he had rebuilt in Augsburg; the burial was performed by Bishop Wolfgang of Regensburg. Later the St. Ulrich and Afra church was built in the same spot. He was succeeded by Bishop Henry I.

The maniple of Ulrich was woven in red and white silk using tablet weaving and Ulrich's relic was later analyzed by Peter Collingwood in his The Techniques of Tablet Weaving; Collingwood regarded it as a "masterpiece".

== Veneration ==
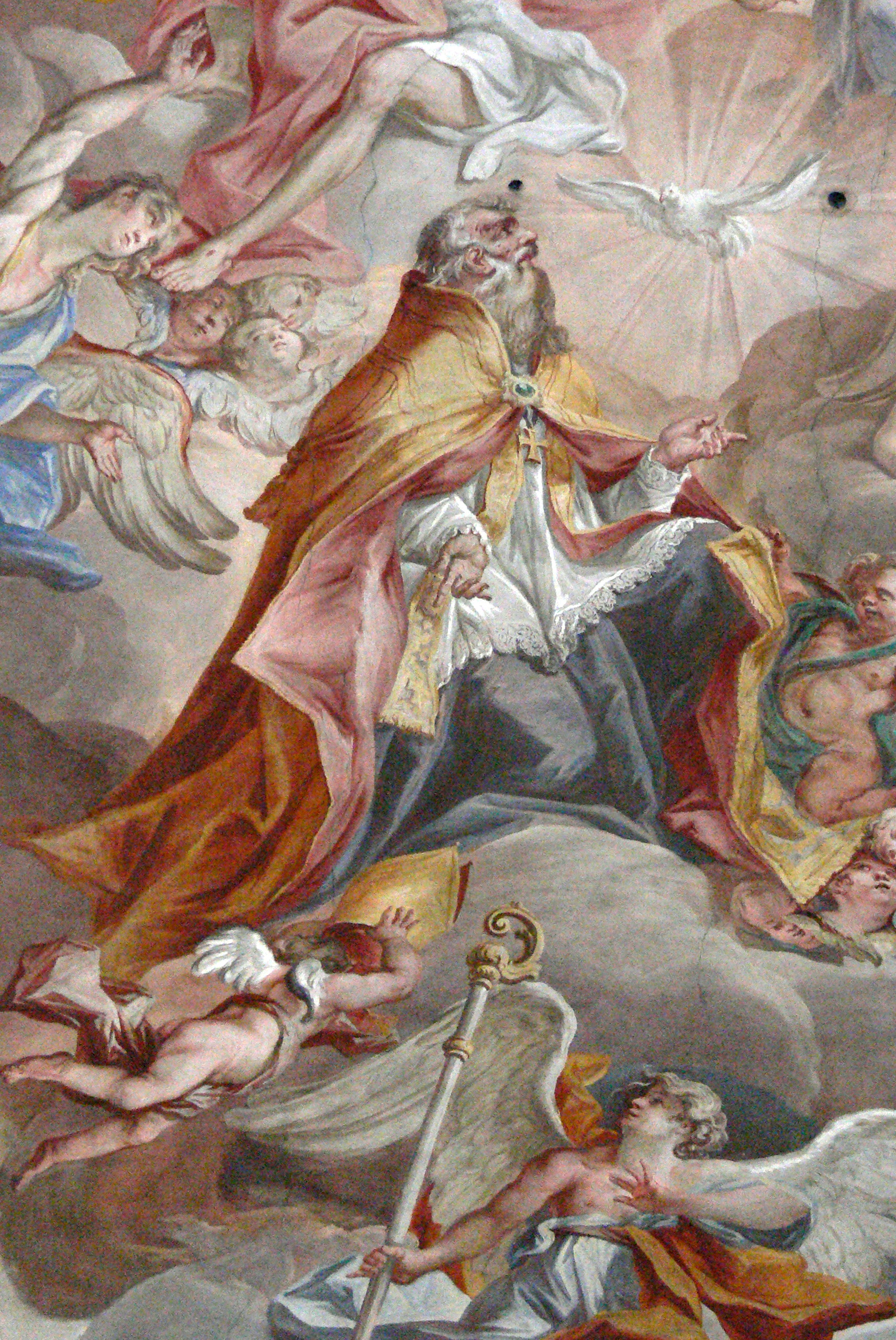
Detail of Glory of Saint Ulrich of Augsburg, a baroque fresco by Simon Benedikt Faistenberger, 1749

When Ulrich was too old and weak to say Mass, angels are said to have come to him to assist him. Places that were named after him are said to be host to healing abilities. Attesting to his early cultus, there is a miniature from the tenth century in a manuscript now in the library of Einsiedeln. Other miniatures are at the Bavarian State Library, in manuscripts dating from the year 1454.

Many miracles are said to have been wrought at his grave; only 20 years after his death, Ulrich was canonised by Pope John XV on 4 July 993. He was the first saint to be canonised by a pope, rather than by a local authority. Walter of Pontoise was the last saint in Western Europe to have been canonised by an authority other than the pope; he was canonised by Hugh of Amiens, the archbishop of Rouen in 1153.

=== Patronage ===
Along with Afra and Simpert, Ulrich is a patron saint of Augsburg. Legend held that pregnant women who drank from his chalice had easy deliveries, and thus developed his patronage of pregnant women and easy births. The touch of his pastoral cross was used to heal people bitten by rabid dogs.

The veneration of Ulrich was carried to the Western Hemisphere by the German Catholic peasant pioneers whom Francis Xavier Pierz persuaded to settle in central Minnesota following the Treaty of Traverse des Sioux in 1851. Along with Magnus of Füssen, Ulrich's intercession was credited with the defeat of the 1856–1857 Rocky Mountain locust plague, and both saints continued afterwards to be venerated in and around Stearns County, Minnesota, with pilgrimages and religious processions. (See also Assumption Chapel).

== Gallery ==
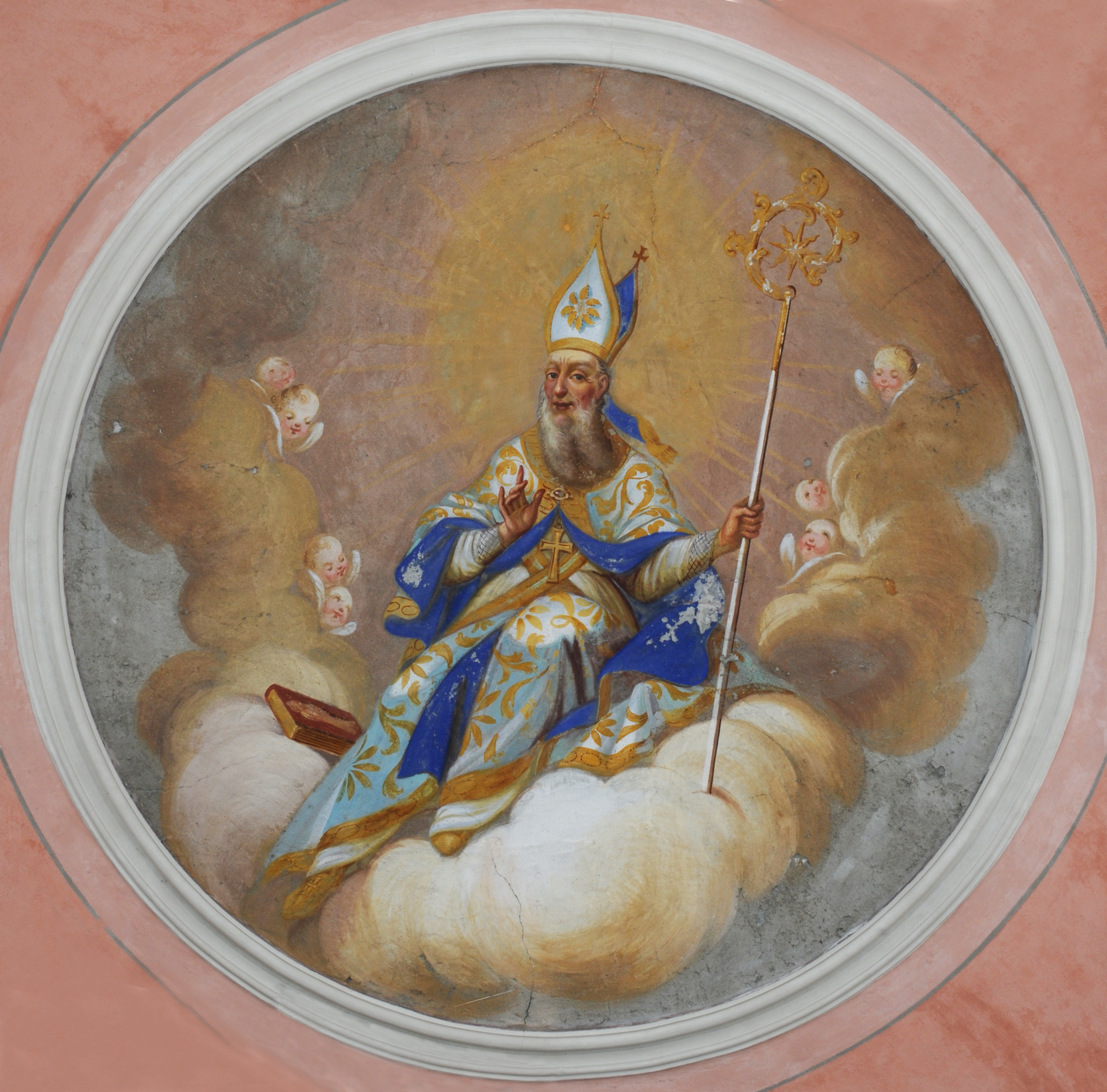
Saint Ulrich in Heaven, Parish church of Urtijëi

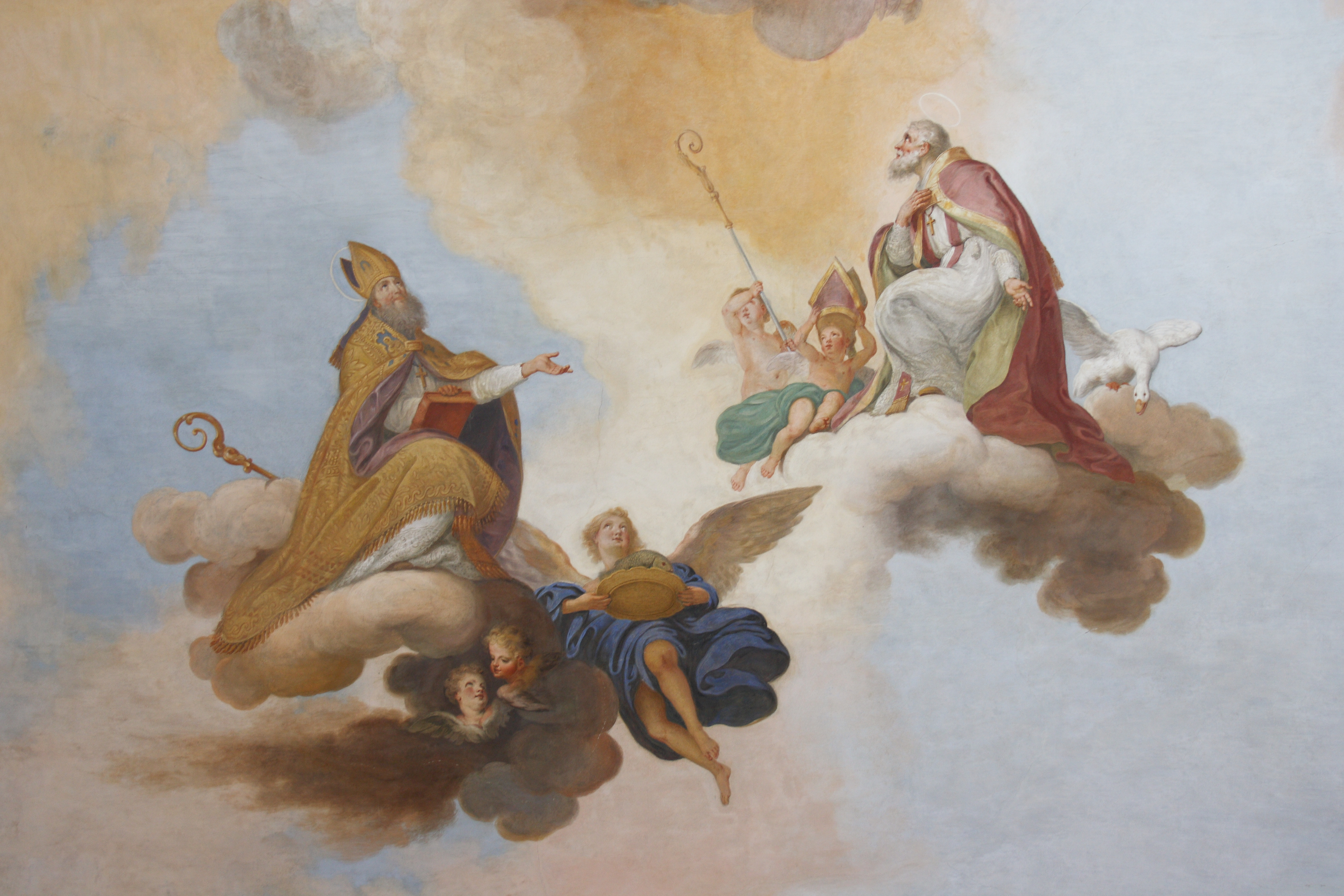
The glorification of Saint Ulrich and Saint Martin

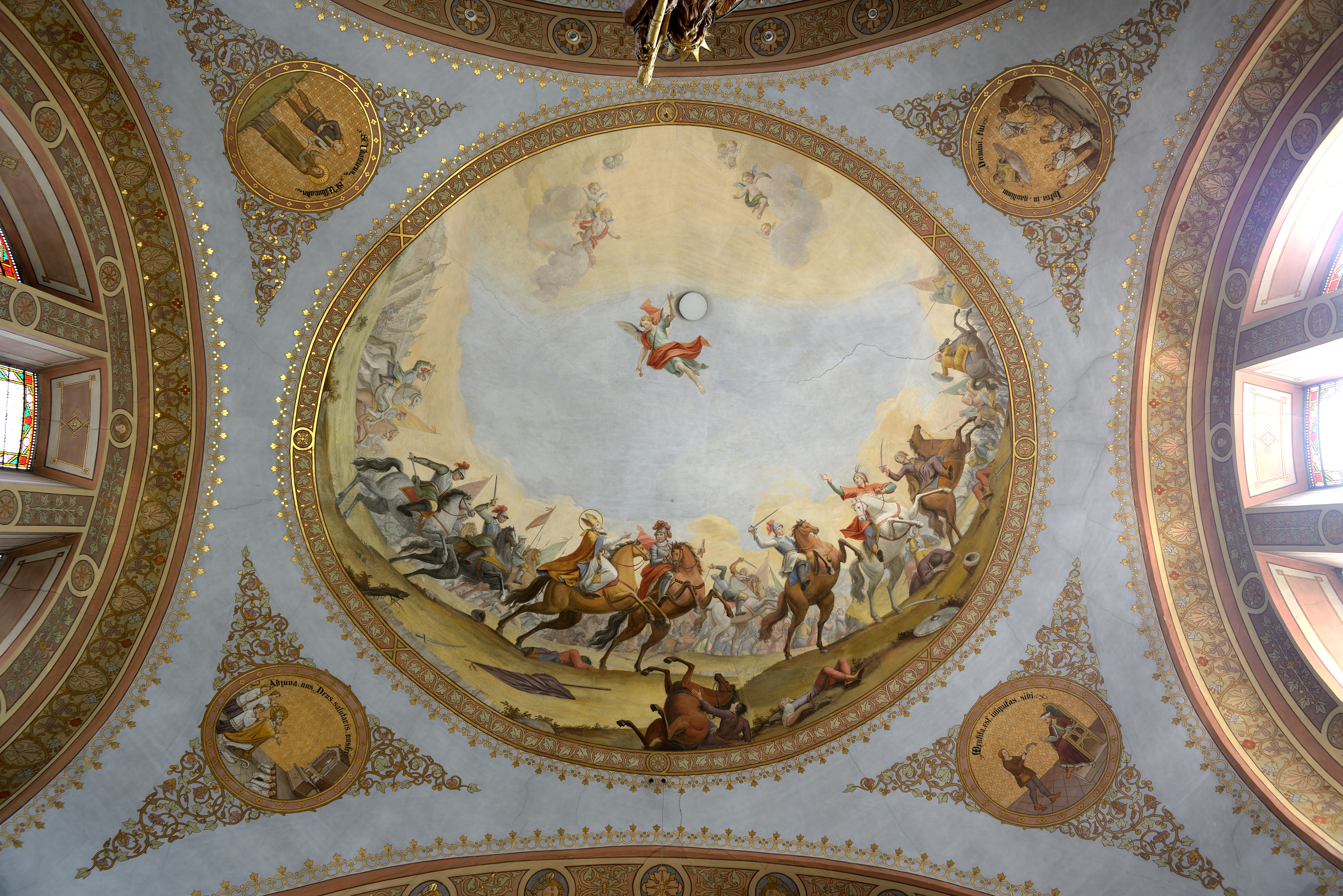
Saint Ulrich from Augsburg in the battle, Parish church of Urtijëi

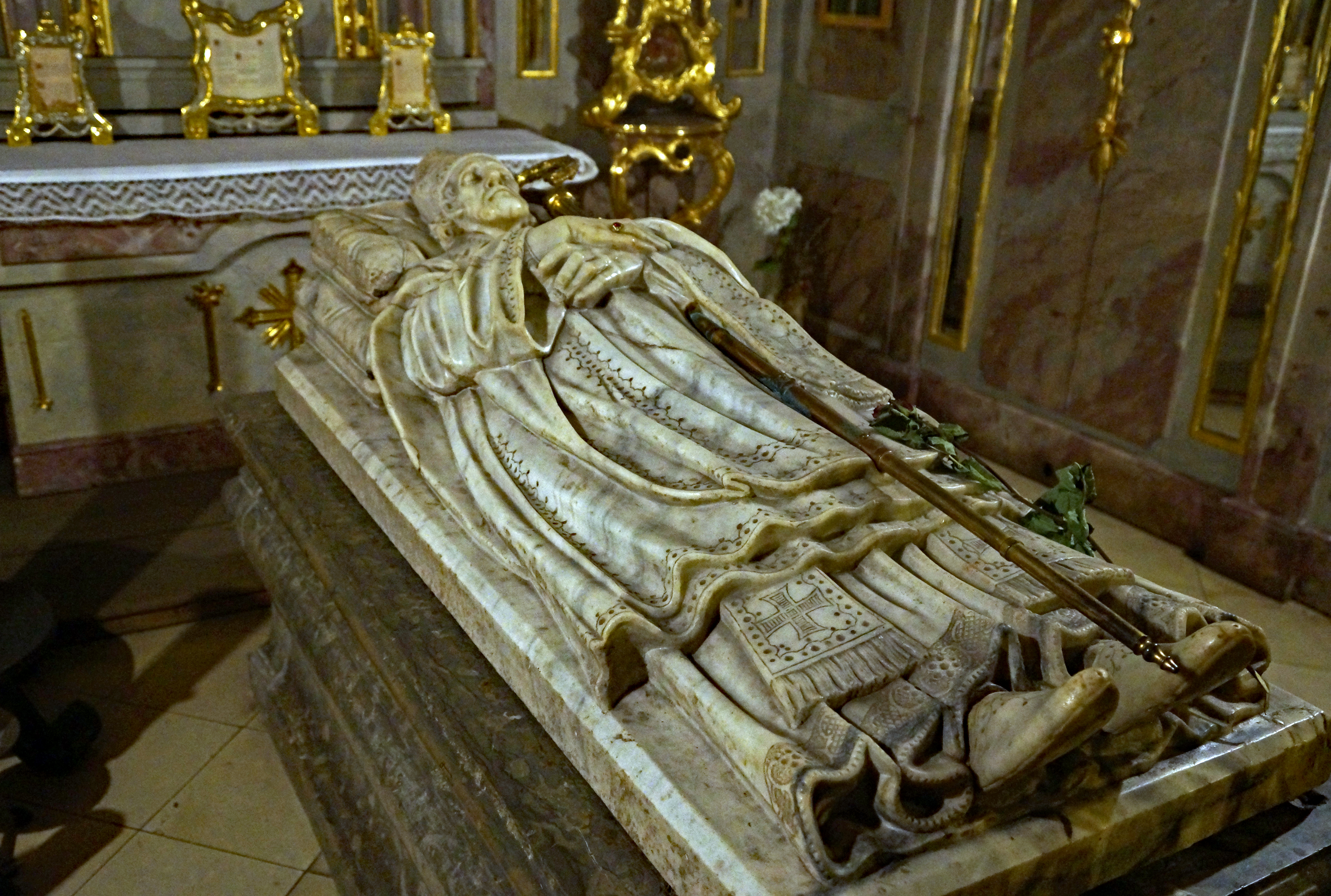
Tomb of Saint Ulrich
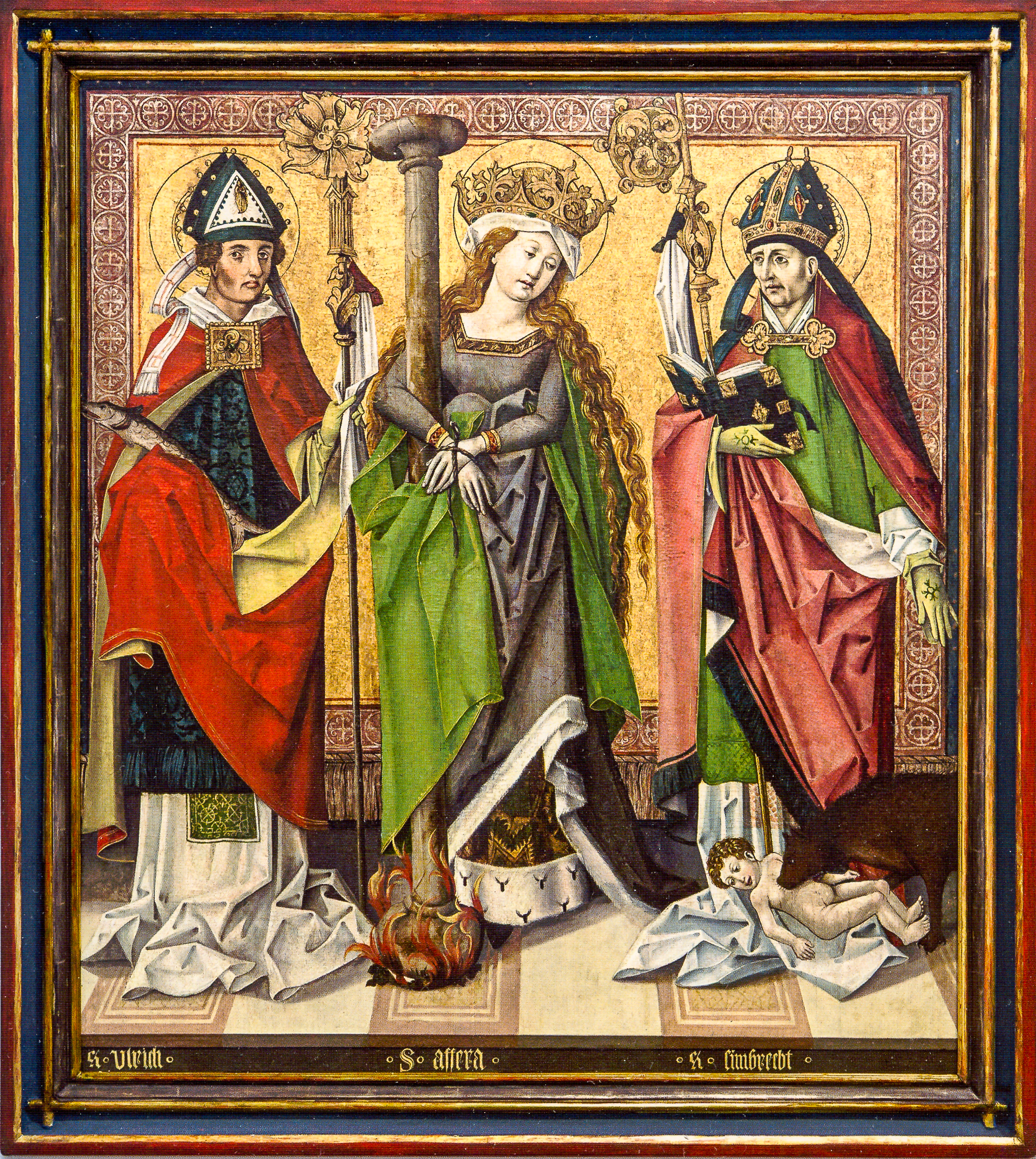
Saints Ulrich of Augsburg, Saint Afra and Simpert

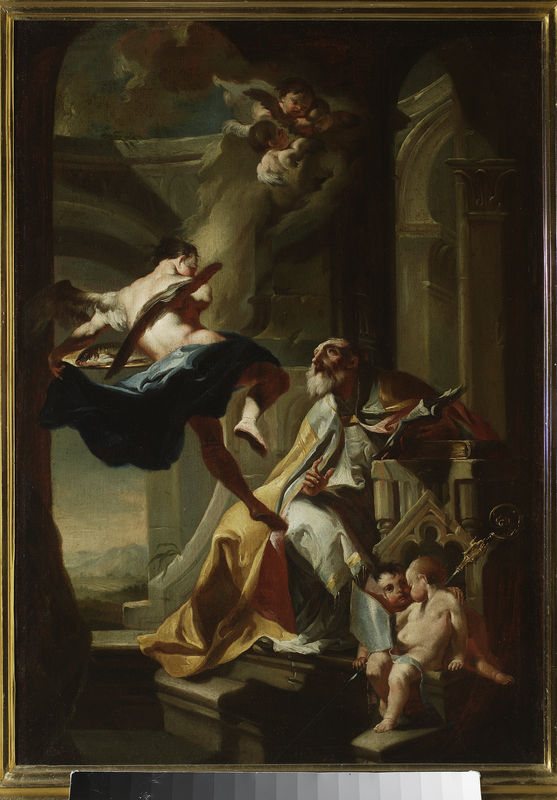
Miracle of Saint Ulrich by Szymon Czechowicz

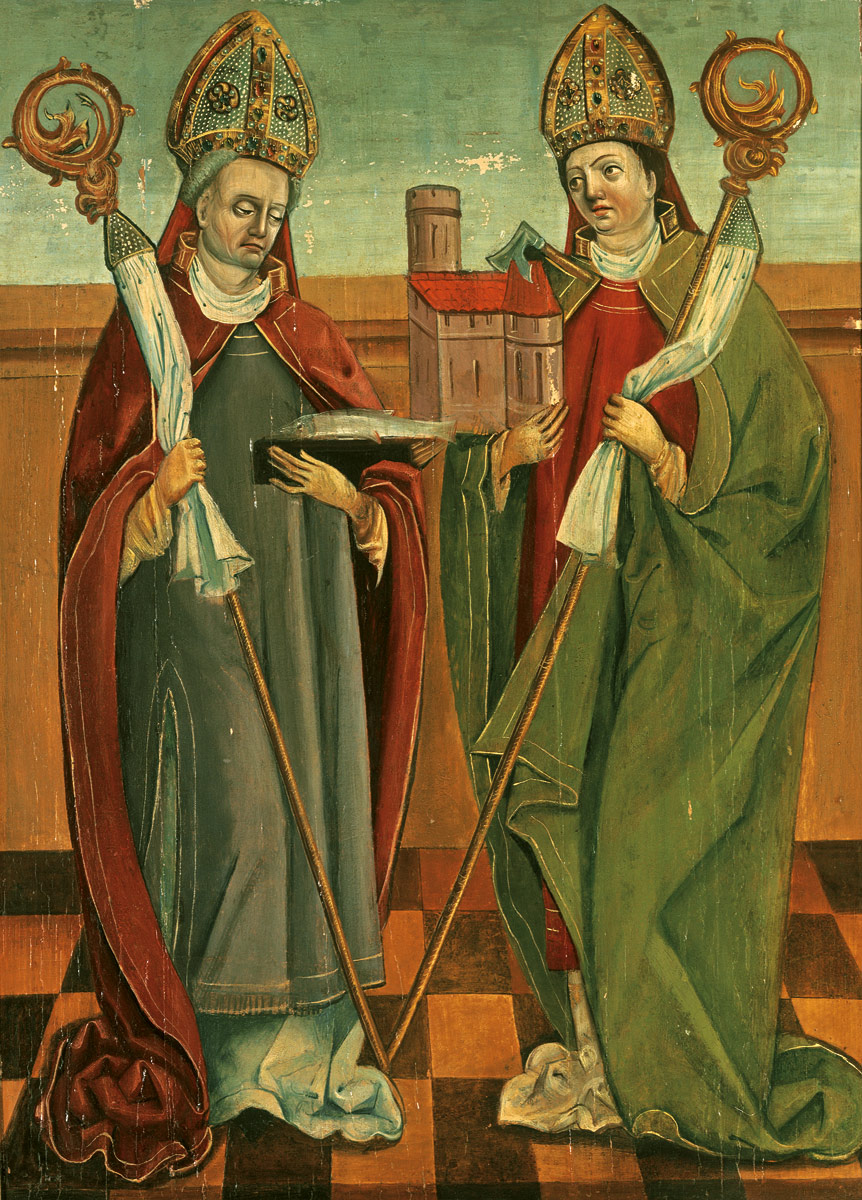
Saint Ulrich and Saint Wolfgang, 1510

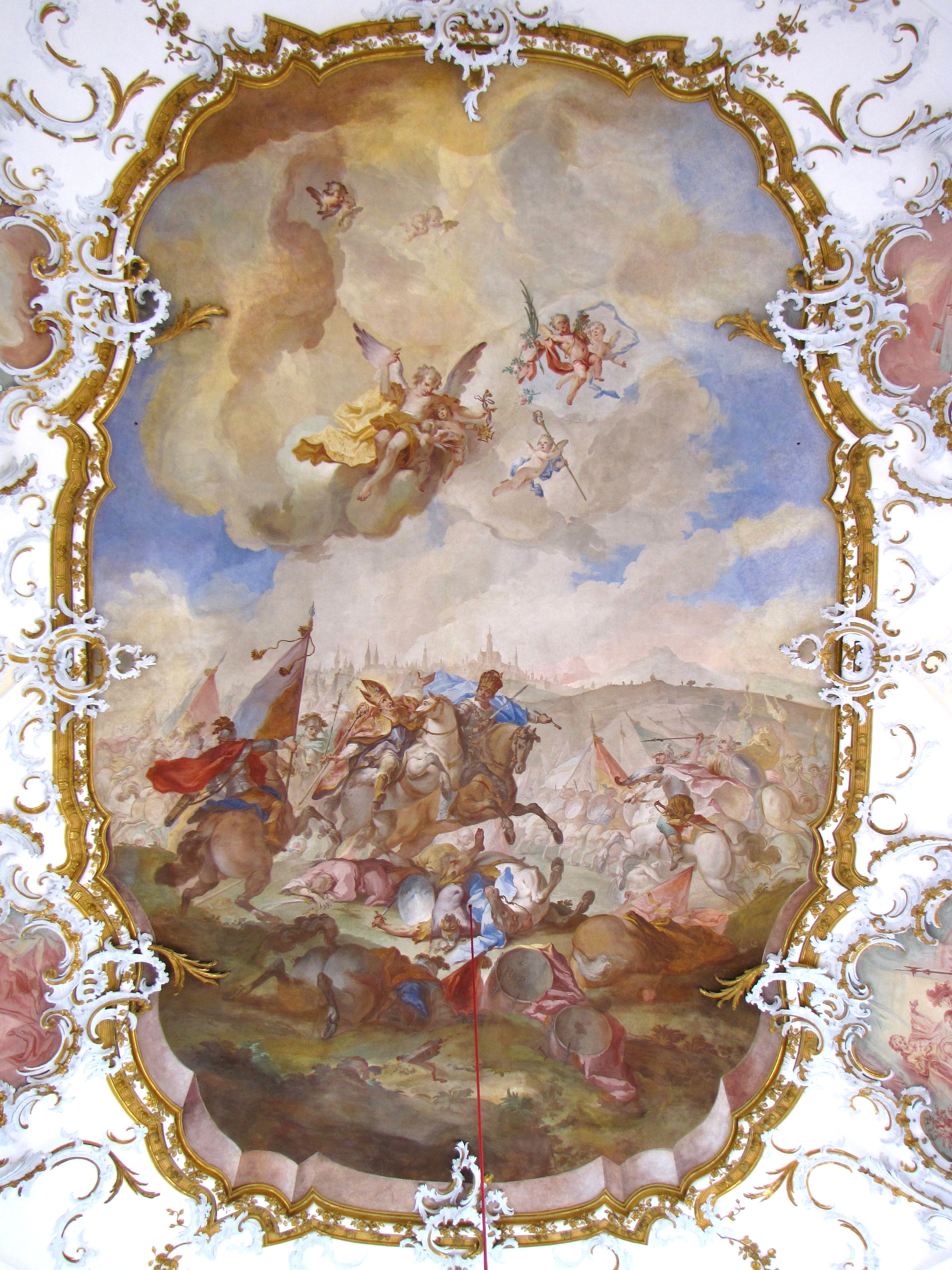
The Battle of Lechfeld, ceiling fresco by Balthasar Riepp, 1744, in the Seeg parish church

== Notes and references ==
=== Bibliography ===
- Delbrück, Hans (1982). History of the Art of War. Vol. Three - Medieval Warfare. Lincoln and London: University of Nebraska Press. ISBN 0-8032-6585-9.
- Gerhard of Augsburg wrote about St. Ulrich's life, the Vita Sancti Uodalrici and several books about his miracles have been written as well.
- Opera Omnia by Migne Patrologia Latina with analytical indexes.

Catholic Church titles
Preceded by Hiltin	Bishop of Augsburg; 923 – 973	Succeeded by Henry I
