= Henry I of Augsburg =

Bishop of Augsburg from 973 to 982

Henri I of Augsburg
- Bishop of Augsburg
- Diocese: Augsburg
- In office: 973 – 982
- Predecessor: Ulrich of Augsburg
- Successor: Eticho of Augsburg

Personal details
- Died: 14 July 982 Capo Colonna
- Denomination: Roman Catholic

Henri I of Augsburg (died 14 July 982) was the count of Geisenhausen and the bishop of Augsburg from 973 to his death. He succeeded Saint Ulrich of Augsburg. A bellicose warrior-bishop, under him the diocese suffered. Henry was the only son of Burkhard Margrave of Marcha Orientalis (later Austria) and his wife Adelheid, a daughter of Arnulf, Duke of Bavaria.

Henry I aided the rebels against the Otto II, Holy Roman Emperor. In 977, he took part in the War of the Three Henries as one of the three Henries. At an Easter court at Magdeburg in 978, he was imprisoned and remained so until July. After his liberation, he denounced the rebels and remained loyal to the king.

He died in the Battle of Stilo in 982 and bequeathed to his church his possessions at Geisenhausen.

Catholic Church titles
Preceded by Ulrich	Bishop of Augsburg; 973 – 982	Succeeded by Eticho
