= Pankratius von Dinkel =

Bishop of Augsburg from 1858 to 1894

- Bishop of Augsburg
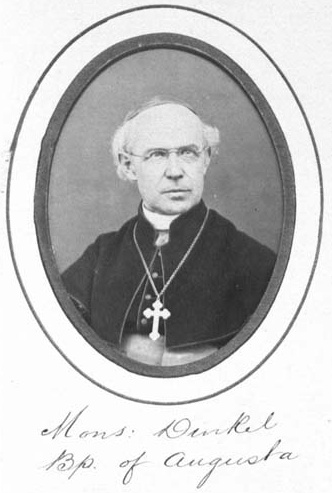
- Pankratius von Dinkel (1870)
- Diocese: Augsburg
- In office: 16 July 1858 – 8 October 1894
- Predecessor: Michael von Deinlein
- Successor: Petrus von Hötzl

Personal details
- Born: 9 February 1811 Staffelstein
- Died: 8 October 1894 (aged 83) Augsburg
- Denomination: Roman Catholic
- Coat of arms

Pankratius von Dinkel (9 February 1811 (Staffelstein) – 8 October 1894 (Augsburg)) was Bishop of Augsburg, Germany from 1858 until his death in 1894.

Born on 9 February 1811, Staffelstein; he was ordained and consecrated as a Parish Priest of Bamberg by Archbishop Gregor Leonhard Andreas von Scherr, O.S.B. on 31 August 1834 at the age of 23.

On 16 July 1858, aged 47, he was appointed as Bishop of Augsburg and confirmed on 27 September. Pankratius was later ordained on 21 November 1858. During his time there, he founded a boys' seminary in Dillingen, had a new diocesan prayer and hymnal created and worked on restoring the cathedral; he also accepted many priests and theology students who had been expelled from Prussia.

He attended the First Vatican Council and was opposed to Papal infallibility.

On 8 October 1894, he died, aged 83, in Augsburg.

He was a priest for 60 years and a bishop for almost 36 years.

== Notes and references ==
Catholic Church titles
Preceded by Michael von Deinlein	Bishop of Augsburg; 1858 – 1894	Succeeded by Petrus von Hötzl
