= Wilhelm Mader =

Auxiliary Bishop of Augsburg from 1447 to 1450

Most Reverend Wilhelm Mader
- Auxiliary Bishop of Augsburg; Titular Bishop of Adramyttium
- Church: Catholic Church
- Diocese: Diocese of Augsburg
- In office: 1447 – 1450

Orders
- Consecration: 16 Apr 1447 by Nicolas Cesari

Personal details
- Died: 1450 Augsburg, Germany

Wilhelm Mader, O. Praem. (died 1450) was a Roman Catholic prelate who served as Auxiliary Bishop of Augsburg (1447–1450).

== Biography ==
Wilhelm Mader was ordained a priest in the Order of Canons Regular of Prémontré. On 29 March 1447, he was appointed during the papacy of Pope Nicholas V as Auxiliary Bishop of Augsburg and Titular Bishop of Adramyttium. On 16 April 1447, he was consecrated bishop by Nicolas Cesari, Bishop of Tivoli, with Antonio Severini, Bishop of Gubbio, and Simeon de Valle, Bishop of Ossero, serving as co-consecrators. He served as Auxiliary Bishop of Augsburg until his death in 1450.
