= Diocese of Augsburg =

Catholic diocese in Germany

Coordinates: 48°22′22″N 10°53′48″E

Diocese of Augsburg Dioecesis Augustanus Vindelicorum Bistum Augsburg

Catholic
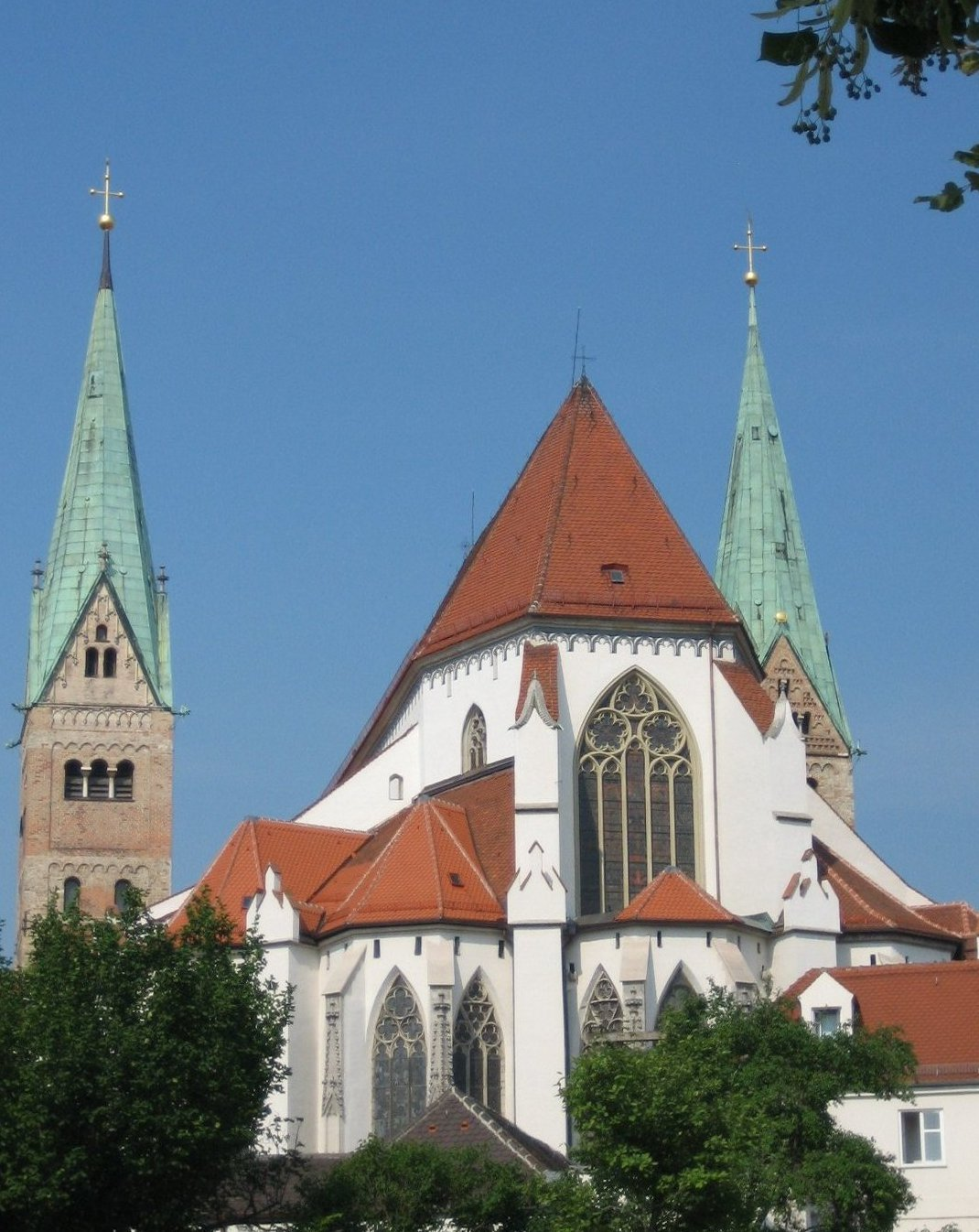
- Augsburg Cathedral

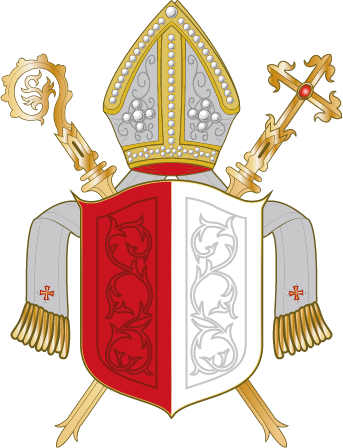
- Coat of arms

Location
- Country: Germany
- Ecclesiastical province: Munich and Freising
- Metropolitan: Archdiocese of Munich and Freising

Statistics
- Area: 13,250 km^{2} (5,120 sq mi)
- Population: Total; Catholics: (as of 2015); 2,316,270; 1,325,316 (57.2%)
- Parishes: 998

Information
- Denomination: Catholic
- Sui iuris church: Latin Church
- Rite: Roman Rite
- Established: 6th Century
- Cathedral: Augsburg Cathedral
- Co-cathedral: Basilica of Sts. Peter and Paul, Dillingen
- Patron saint: St. Ulric of Augsburg; St. Simbert of Augsburg; St. Afra

Current leadership
- Pope: Leo XIV
- Bishop: Bertram Meier
- Metropolitan Archbishop: Reinhard Marx
- Auxiliary Bishops: Anton Losinger; Florian Wörner
- Vicar General: Harald Heinrich
- Bishops emeritus: Konrad Zdarsa; Walter Mixa; Josef Grünwald

Map
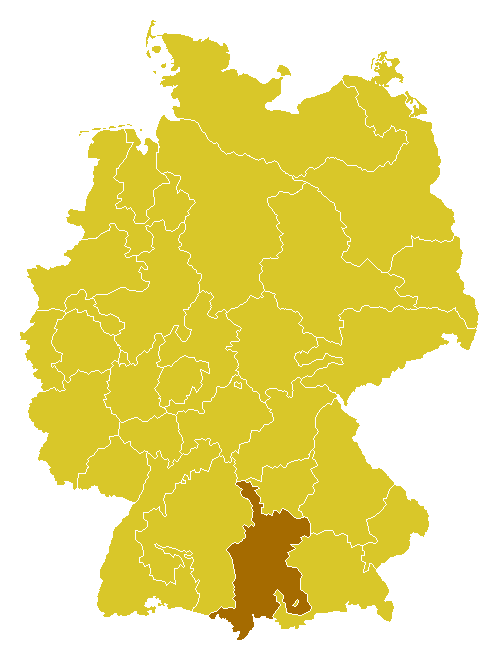

Website
- bistum-augsburg.de

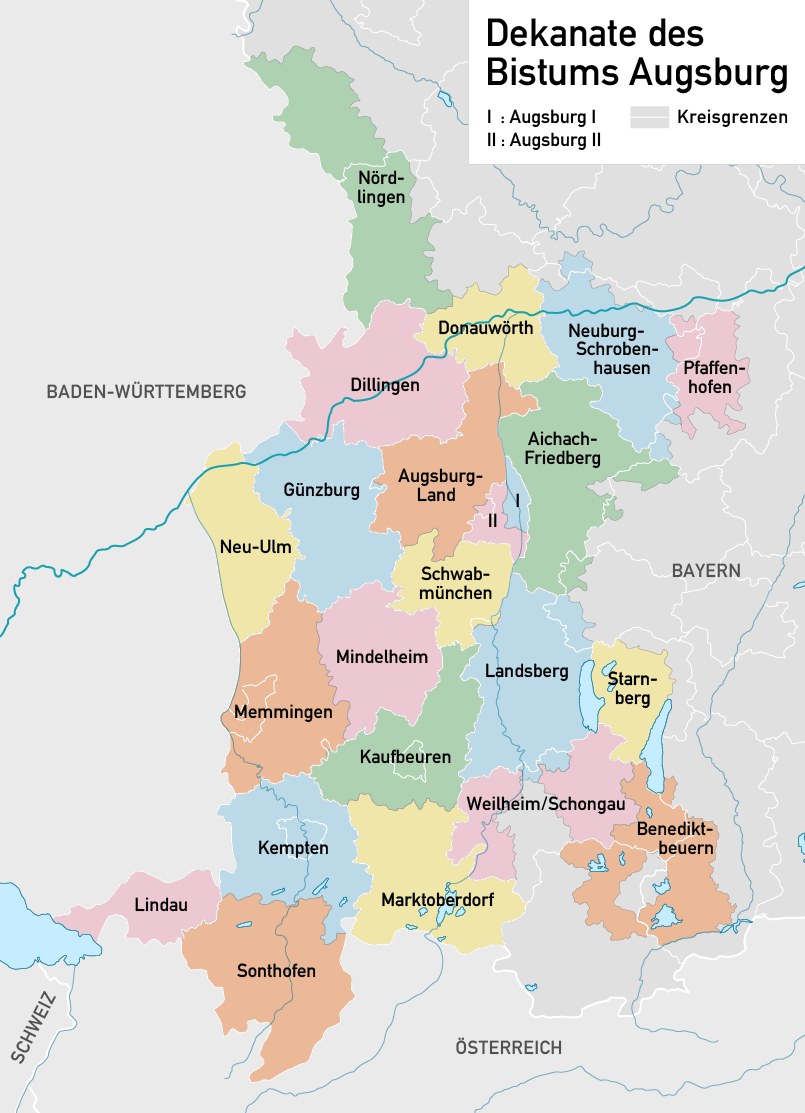
Map of the deaneries of the Bishopric of Augsburg

Diocese of Augsburg (Latin: Dioecesis Augustanus Vindelicorum) is a Latin diocese of the Catholic Church in Germany. The diocese is a suffragan of the Archdiocese of Munich.

== History ==
=== Early history ===
The present city of Augsburg appears in Strabo as Damasia, a stronghold of the Licatii; in 14 BC, it became a Roman colony known as Augusta Vindelicorum, received the rights of a city from Hadrian and soon became of great importance as an arsenal and the point of junction of several important trade routes.

Though the beginnings of Christianity within the limits of the present diocese are shrouded in obscurity, its teachings were probably brought there by soldiers or merchants. According to the acts of the martyrdom of St. Afra, who with her handmaids suffered at the stake for Christ, there existed in Augsburg early in the fourth century a Christian community under Bishop Narcissus. Dionysius, uncle of St. Afra, is mentioned as his successor.

Nothing authentic is known about the history of the Augsburg Church during the centuries immediately succeeding, but it survived the collapse of Roman power in Germany and the turbulence of the great migrations. It is true that two catalogues of the Bishops of Augsburg, dating from the eleventh and twelfth centuries, mention several bishops of this primitive period, but the first whose record has received indubitable historical corroboration is Wikterp (or Wicbpert), who was bishop about 739 or 768. He took part in several synods convened by Saint Boniface in Germany; in company with Magnus of Füssen, founded the monastery of Füssen; and with Saint Boniface, dedicated the monastery at Benediktbeuern.

Under either Saint Wikterp or his successor, Tazzo (or Tozzo), about whom little is known, many monasteries were established, e.g. the abbeys of Wessobrunn, Ellwangen, Polling and Ottobeuren. At this time, also, the see, hitherto suffragan to the Patriarchate of Aquileia, was placed among the suffragan sees of the newly founded Archdiocese of Mainz (746). Saint Simpert (c. 810), hitherto abbot of Murbach, and a relative of Charlemagne, renovated many churches and monasteries laid waste in the wars of the Franks and Bavarians, and during the incursions of the Avari; he built the first cathedral of Augsburg in honour of the Virgin Mary; and obtained from the Emperor Charlemagne an exact definition of his diocesan limits. His jurisdiction extended at that time from the Iller eastward over the Lech, north of the Danube to the Alb, and south to the spurs of the Alps. Moreover, various estates and villages in the valley of the Danube, and in Tyrol, belonged to the diocese.

=== Restoration ===
After the Congress of Vienna, where the diocese was restored, Franz Karl von Hohenlohe-Schillingsfürst (d. 1819) was appointed bishop and Joseph Maria von Fraunberg was soon called to the archdiocese of Bamberg. There, they devolved upon their successors the important task of rearranging the external conditions and reanimating religious life, which had suffered sorely. Ignatius Albert von Riegg (1824–1836) was successful in his endeavors to raise the standard of popular education through the medium of numerous ordinances and frequent visitations. He assigned the administration and direction of studies in the Lyceum to the monks of the Benedictine Abbey of St. Stephen in Augsburg, founded by King Ludwig I of Bavaria (1834).

Petrus von Richarz (1837–1855) displayed energy and persistent zeal in promoting the interests of his diocese and the Catholic Church in general, and encouraged the giving of missions to the people, the establishment of many religious institutions for the care of the sick and for educational purposes, and carefully superintended the training of the clergy. The same spirit characterized the labours of the succeeding bishops: Michael Deinlein (1856–1858), who after a short episcopate was raised to the Archbishopric of Bamberg; Pankratius von Dinkel (1858–1894), under whom both seminaries and the deaf and dumb asylum were established in Dillingen, and many monastic institutions were founded; Petrus von Hotzl (1895-1902) whose episcopate was marked by the attention paid to social and intellectual pursuits, and the number of missions given among the people as well as by the solemn celebration of the beatification of the pious Franciscan sister, Maria Crescentia Höss. He was succeeded by Maximilian von Lingg.

== Bishops ==
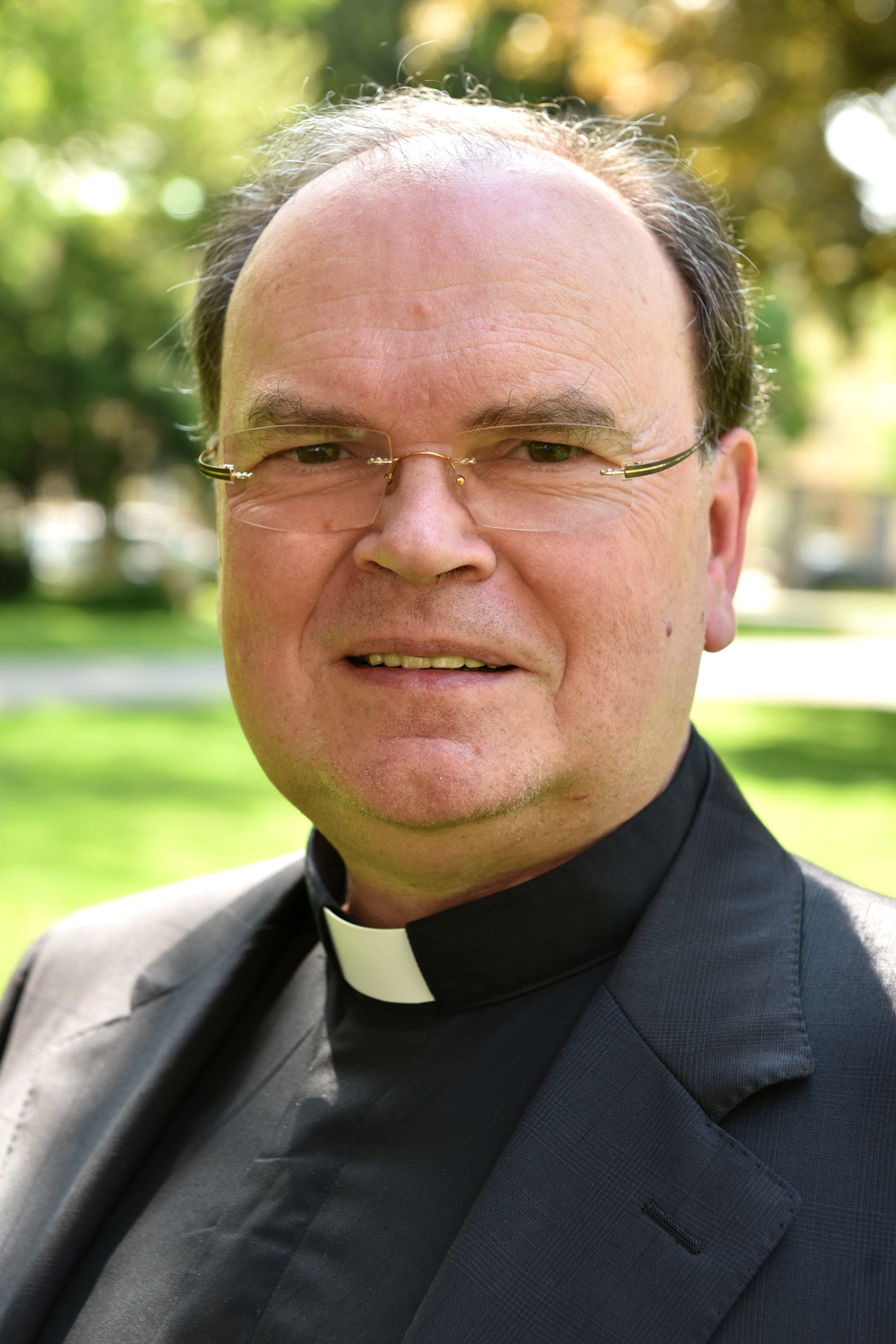
Bertram Meier (2017)

=== To 1000 ===
- Narzissus, fourth century
- Dionysius of Augsburg (Uncle of Afra of Augsburg), uncertain
- Zosimus
- Perewelf (Beowulf)
- Tagebert (Dagobert)
- Manno
- Wicho
- Bricho
- Zeizzo (Zeiso)
- Marchmann (Markmann)
- Wikterp (Wicterp), 738–772
- Tozzo (Thosso), 772–778
- Simpert, 778–807
- Hanto, 807–815
- Nidker of Augsburg (Nidgar), 816–830
- Udalmann, 830–832
- Lanto, 833–860
- Witgar, 861–887
- Adalbero (Adalberon von Dillingen), 887–909
- Hiltin, 909–923
- Ulrich of Augsburg, 923–973
- Henry I (Henry von Geisenhausen), 973–982
- Eticho (Eticho der Welfe), 982–988
- Liutold (Ludolf von Hohenlowe), 989–996
- Gebehard (Gebhard von Ammerthal), 996–1000

=== 1000 to 1300 ===
- Siegfried I, 1001–1006
- Bruno of Augsburg, 1006–1029
- Eberhard I, 1029–1047
- Henry II, 1047–1063
- Embrico, 1063–1077
- Siegfried II, 1077–1096
- Hermann von Vohburg, 1096–1133
- Walter I von Dillingen, 1133–1152
- Konrad von Hirscheck, 1152–1167
- Hartwig I von Lierheim, 1167–1184
- Udalschalk, 1184–1202
- Hartwig II, 1202–1208
- Siegfried III von Rechberg, 1208–1227
- Siboto von Seefeld, 1227–1247
- Hartmann of Dillingen, 1248–1286
- Siegfried IV von Algertshausen, 1286–1288
- Wolfhard von Roth, 1288–1302

=== 1300 to 1500 ===
- Degenhard von Hellenstein, 1303–1307
- Friedrich I Spät von Faimingen, 1309–1331
- Ulrich II von Schönegg, 1331–1337
- Henry III von Schönegg, 1337–1348
- Marquard of Randeck, 1348–1365
- Walter II von Hochschlitz, 1365–1369
- Johann I. Schadland, 1371–1372
- Burkhard von Ellerbach, 1373–1404
- Eberhard II von Kirchberg, 1404–1413
- Friedrich von Grafeneck, 1413–1414
- Anselm von Nenningen, 1414–1423
- Peter von Schaumberg, 1424–1469
- John II of Werdenberg, 1469–1486
- Friedrich von Hohenzollern, 1486–1505

=== 1500 to 1800 ===
- Heinrich von Lichtenau, 1505–1517
- Christoph von Stadion, 1517–1543
- Otto Truchsess von Waldburg, 1543–1573
- Johann Eglof von Knöringen, 1573–1575
- Marquard von Berg, 1575–1591
- Johann Otto von Gemmingen, 1591–1598
- Heinrich von Knöringen, 1599–1646
- Sigismund Francis, Archduke of Austria, 1646–1665
- Johann Christoph von Freyberg-Allmendingen, 1665–1690
- Alexander Sigismund von der Pfalz-Neuburg, 1690–1737
- Johann Franz Schenk von Stauffenberg, 1737–1740
- Joseph Ignaz Philipp von Hessen-Darmstadt, 1740–1768
- Clemens Wenceslaus of Saxony, 1768–1812

== Since 1800 ==
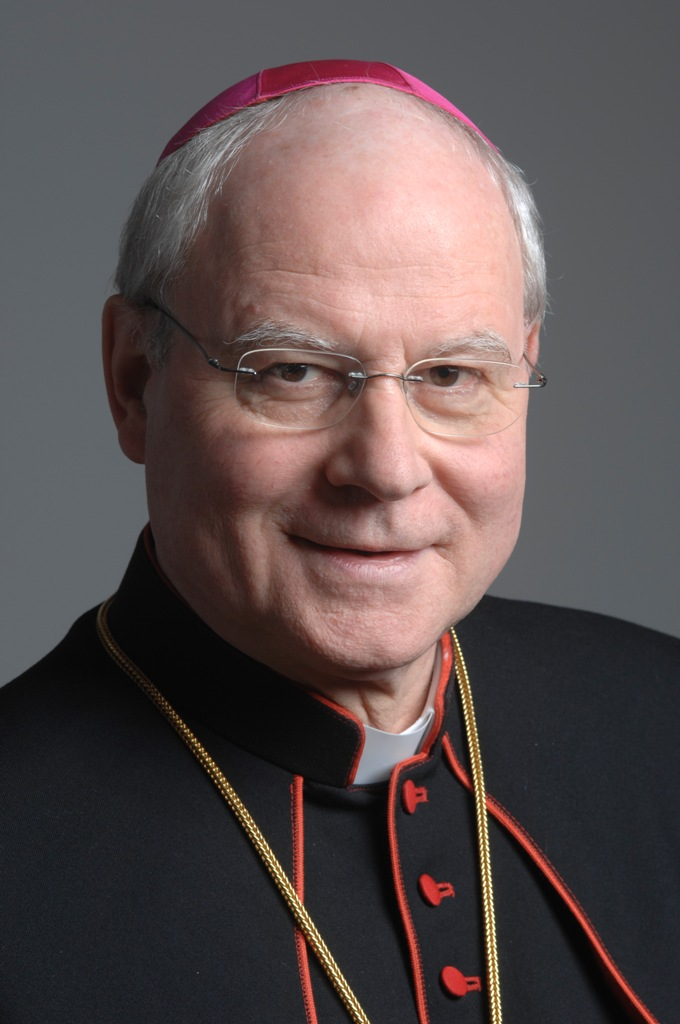
Bishop emeritus of Augsburg Konrad Zdarsa

- Franz Friedrich von Sturmfeder, General vicar 1812–1818
- Franz Karl Joseph Fürst von Hohenlohe-Waldenburg-Schillingsfürst (5 February 1818 Appointed – 9 October 1819 Died)
- Joseph Maria Johann Nepomuk Freiherr von Fraunberg (6 December 1819 Appointed – 4 March 1824 Appointed, Archbishop of Bamberg)
- Ignatz Albert (Joseph Ignatz Alexius) von Riegg, O.S.A. (4 March 1824 Appointed – 15 August 1836 Died)
- Johann Peter von Richarz (20 September 1836 Appointed – 2 July 1855 Died)
- Michael von Deinlein (12 January 1856 Appointed – 17 June 1858 Appointed, Archbishop of Bamberg)
- Pankratius von Dinkel (16 July 1858 Appointed – 8 October 1894 Died)
- Petrus von Hötzl, O.F.M. (7 November 1894 Appointed – 9 March 1902 Died)
- Maximilian von Lingg (18 March 1902 Appointed – 31 May 1930 Died)
- Joseph Kumpfmüller (17 September 1930 Appointed – 9 February 1949 Died)
- Josef Freundorfer (9 July 1949 Appointed – 11 April 1963 Died)
- Josef Stimpfle (10 September 1963 Appointed – 30 March 1992 Retired)
- Viktor Josef Dammertz, O.S.B. (24 December 1992 Appointed – 9 Jun 2004 Retired)
- Walter Mixa (16 July 2005 Appointed – 8 May 2010 Resigned)
- Konrad Zdarsa (8 July 2010 – 4 July 2019)
- Bertram Meier (29 January 2020 Appointed -)

== Auxiliary bishops ==
- Jean Heysterbach, O.P. (1436–1447)
- Wilhelm Mader, O. Praem. (1447–1450)
- Martin Dieminger (1450–1460)
- Jodok Seitz, O. Praem. (1460–1471)
- Jakob Goffredi (1471–1473)
- Ulrich Geislinger, O.F.M. (1474–1493)
- Johann Kerer (1493–1506)
- Heinrich Negelin (Nagele) (1506–1520)
- Johann Laymann (1521–1546)
- Marcus Vetter (1546–1554)
- Sebastian Breuning (1586–1618)
- Michael Dornvogel 1554–1586)
- Peter Wall (1618–1630)
- Sebastian Müller (1631–1644)
- Kaspar Zeiler (1646–1665)
- Johann Eustach Egolf von Westernach (1681–1707)
- Johann Kasimir Röls (1708–1715)
- Franz Theodor von Guttenberg (1716–1717)
- Johann Jakob von Mayer (1718–1749)
- Franz Xaver von Adelmann von Adelmannsfelden (1750–1787)
- Johann Nepomuk August Ungelter von Deisenhausen (1779–1804)
- Franz Karl Joseph von Hohenlohe-Waldenburg-Schillingsfürst (1802–1818) Appointed Bishop of Augsburg
- Johann Baptist Judas Thaddeus von Keller (1816–1828)
- Peter Göbl (1911–1916)
- Josef Kumpfmüller (1930–1949)
- Franz Xaver Eberle 1934–1951)
- Manfred Müller (1972–1982)
- Karl Reth (1916–1933)
- Joseph Zimmermann (1952–1972)
- Rudolf Schmid (1972–1990)
- Maximilian Ziegelbauer (1983–1998)
- Josef Grünwald (1995–2011)
- Anton Losinger (2000–present)
- Florian Wörner (2012–present)

== See also ==
- Basilica of Sts. Peter and Paul, Dillingen
