= Augsburg Cathedral =

German cathedral

Coordinates: 48°22′22″N 10°53′48″E

- Dom Mariä Heimsuchung
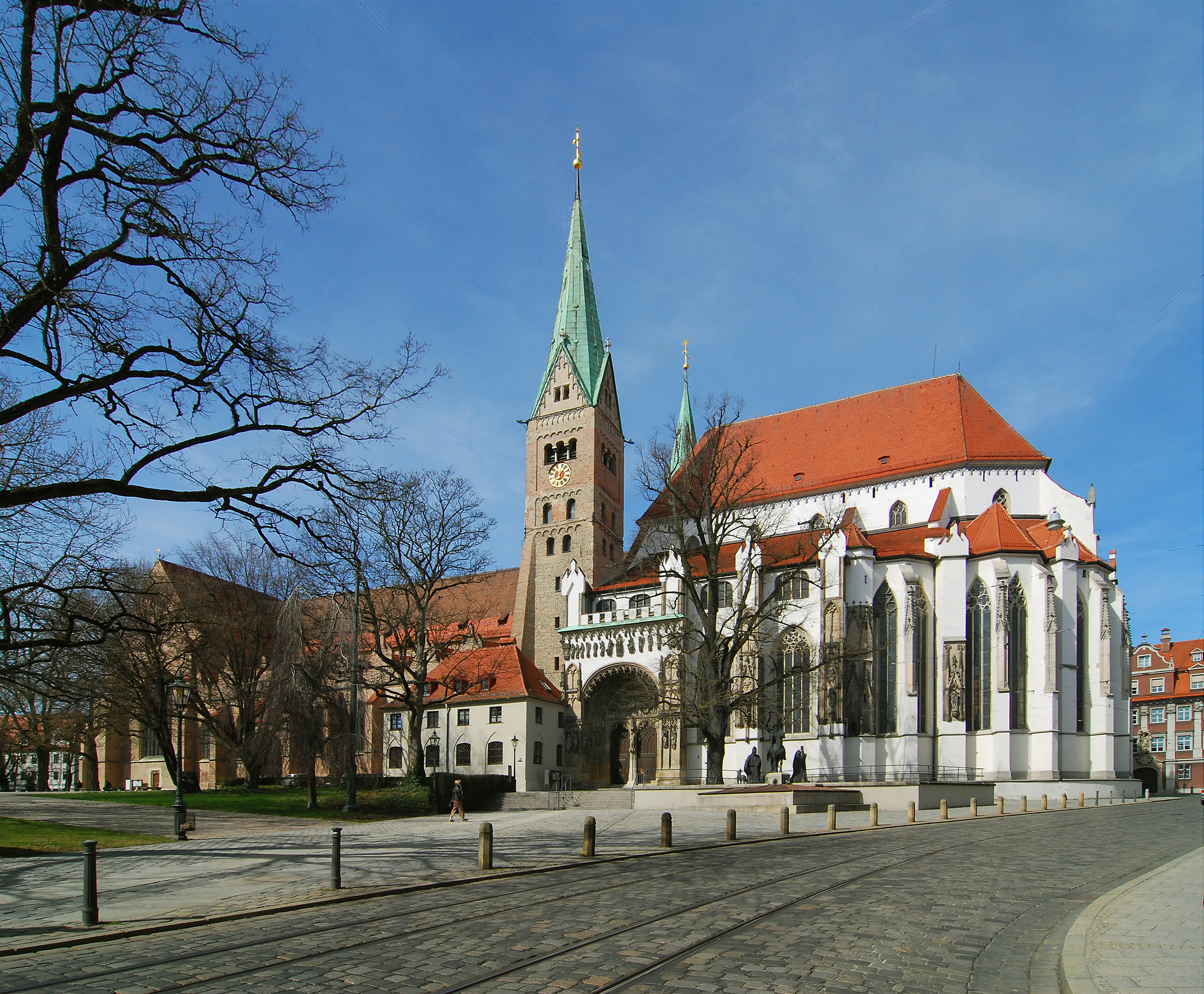
- View of the cathedral from the southeast
- Augsburg Cathedral
- Location: Augsburg, Bavaria
- Country: Germany
- Denomination: Catholic Church
- Tradition: Latin Church

History
- Dedication: Mary, mother of Jesus

Architecture
- Style: Romanesque/Gothic

Administration
- Diocese: Diocese of Augsburg

The Cathedral of Augsburg (German: Dom Mariä Heimsuchung) is a Catholic cathedral in Augsburg, Bavaria, Germany, founded in the 11th century in Romanesque style, but with 14th-century Gothic additions. Together with the Basilica of St. Ulrich and Afra, it is one of the city's main attractions. It measures 113 x 40 m, and its towers are 62 m high. It is dedicated to the Visitation of Virgin Mary.

== History ==
The cathedral is perhaps located on the site of a pre-existing 4th-century building, not necessarily a church, whose foundations have been excavated beneath the current level; the site is included within the ancient Roman walls of Augusta Vindelicorum. The first known church in the place is documented from 822, but dating to the late 8th century reigns of bishops Wikterp and Simpert.

The edifice was damaged by the Magyars and was restored in 923 under bishop Ulrich. Another repairing intervention occurred in 994 when the western apse crumbled down; the restoration was funded by empress Adelaide. The current Romanesque structure was commissioned in 1043 by Bishop Henry III and was completed in 1065. The two towers, which are visible from the whole city, were completed in 1075. From 1331 to 1431 numerous Gothic elements were added, including the eastern choir.

During the Protestant Reformation, the church lost most of its religious artworks, although some were later restored. The interior, which was turned into a Baroque one during the 17th century, was partially restored to its late medieval appearance in the 19th century, with the addition of some neo-Gothic elements. In 1565 the northern tower was heightened. The church suffered only limited damage during World War II, mostly to the Chapel of Our Lady.

== Description ==
The church has some unusual features, such as the absence of true façade and the presence of two choirs. It is on the basilica plan with a nave and four aisles and is primarily built of red brickwork, supported by buttresses. The western apse is preceded by a transept. It has also two choirs and two towers, ending with a triangular pediment and copper spires. In front of the church are the foundations of the church of St. John (10th century) and remains of the Roman walls.

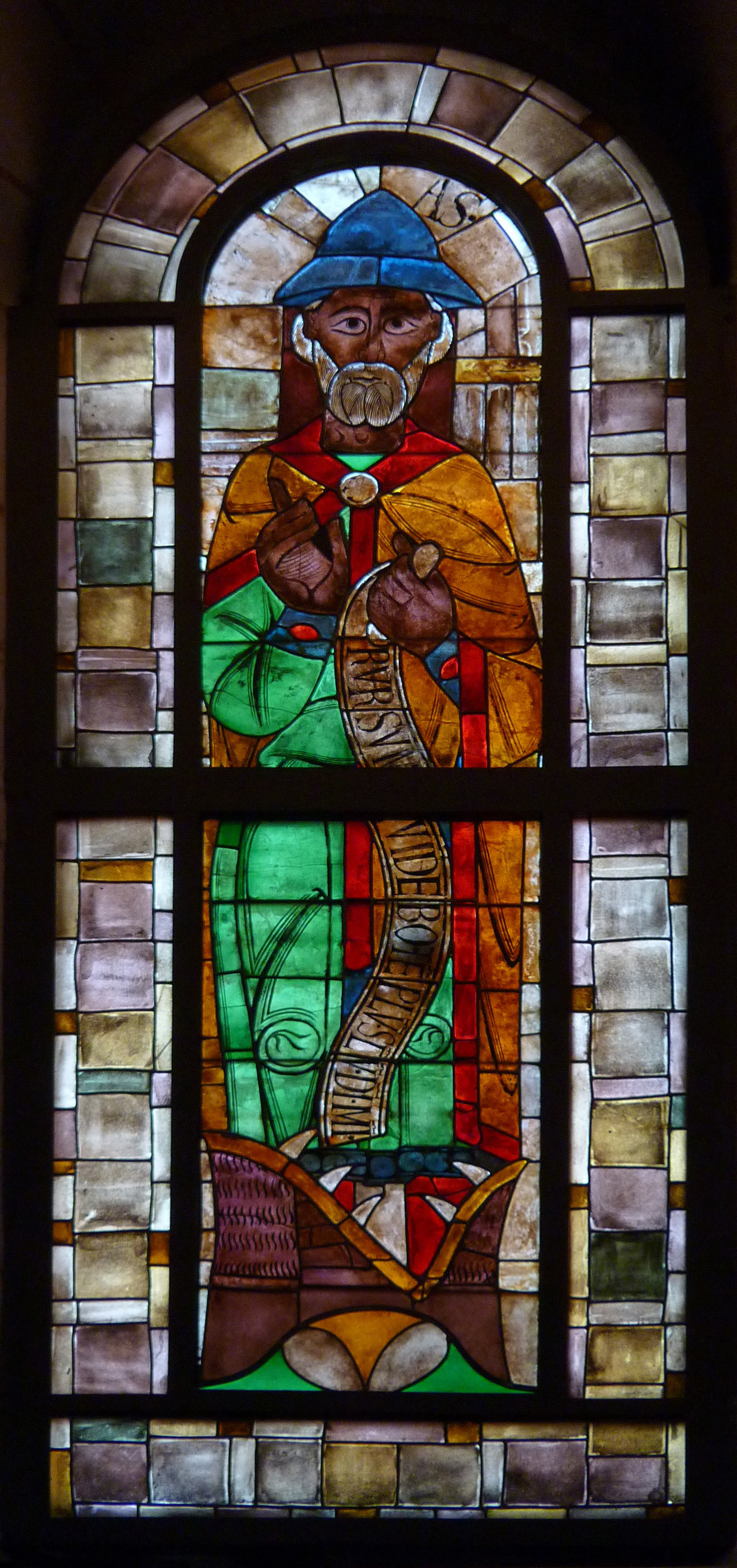
Stained glass window of Prophet Jonah.

The southern portal, dating to 1356, features numerous carved reliefs, portraying scenes from the life of the Virgin Mary on the tympanum and the central column, while on the jambs are the stories of the apostles. The northern portal (1343) has a tympanum with the Annunciation, the Birth of Christ, the Adoration of the Magi, and the Death and the Coronation of the Virgin. Some of the figures have been transferred to the interior.

The 11th-century bronze door, once in the southern choir portal, is now in the Cathedral's Museum. It includes 35 bronze panels in two series: on the left are scenes from the Old Testament, including the creation of Eve and her meeting with Adam; the Garden of Eden and the Serpent; Moses and the rod transformed into a serpent; the miracle of Aaron upon of the Egyptians' rods; Samson taming the lion and killing the Philistines. The other series, on the right, depicts episodes from the New Testament: the woman who lost a piece of silver; the Heaven birds; a vineyard, as well as the predecessors of Christ: Melchizedek, Moses, Aaron, David, Judas Maccabaeus and other Prophets. Finally, there are lions, bears, birds and centaurs, element of medieval symbolism.

The southern clerestory has five stained glass windows dated to the late 11th-early 12th centuries, the oldest in Germany: they feature the prophets David, Jonah, Daniel, Moses, Hosea, and were perhaps part of a larger series, the others now being missing. The southern aisles house more recent medieval stained glass windows (1330–1340), with stories of the Virgin Mary. The western choir contains three windows by Johannes Schreiter which symbolically show the Coming of the Kingdom of God.

The nave pillars have four paintings of the life of Mary, executed by Hans Holbein the Elder in 1493. The northern transept has a series of portraits of the bishops of Augsburg, which was begun in 1488 and continued up to modern times. The Chapel of Our Lady was designed in 1720-21 by Gabriel de Gabrieli.

Other artworks in the church include the bishop's throne (c. 1100), supported by two crouched lions; the bronze tomb of Bishop Wolfhart Rot (1302) and other bishops; a large fresco depicting St. Christopher (southern transept, 1491); an "Ecce Homo" by Baroque artist Georg Petel. The church has also a Romanesque crypt, dating to the 10th century and located under the western choir, and an annexed cloister.

== Sources ==
- Chevalley, Denis André (1995). Der Dom zu Augsburg (in German). Munich: Verlag Oldenbourg. ISBN 3-486-55960-5.
