= Simpert =

Bishop of Augsburg from 778 to 807

Saint Simpert
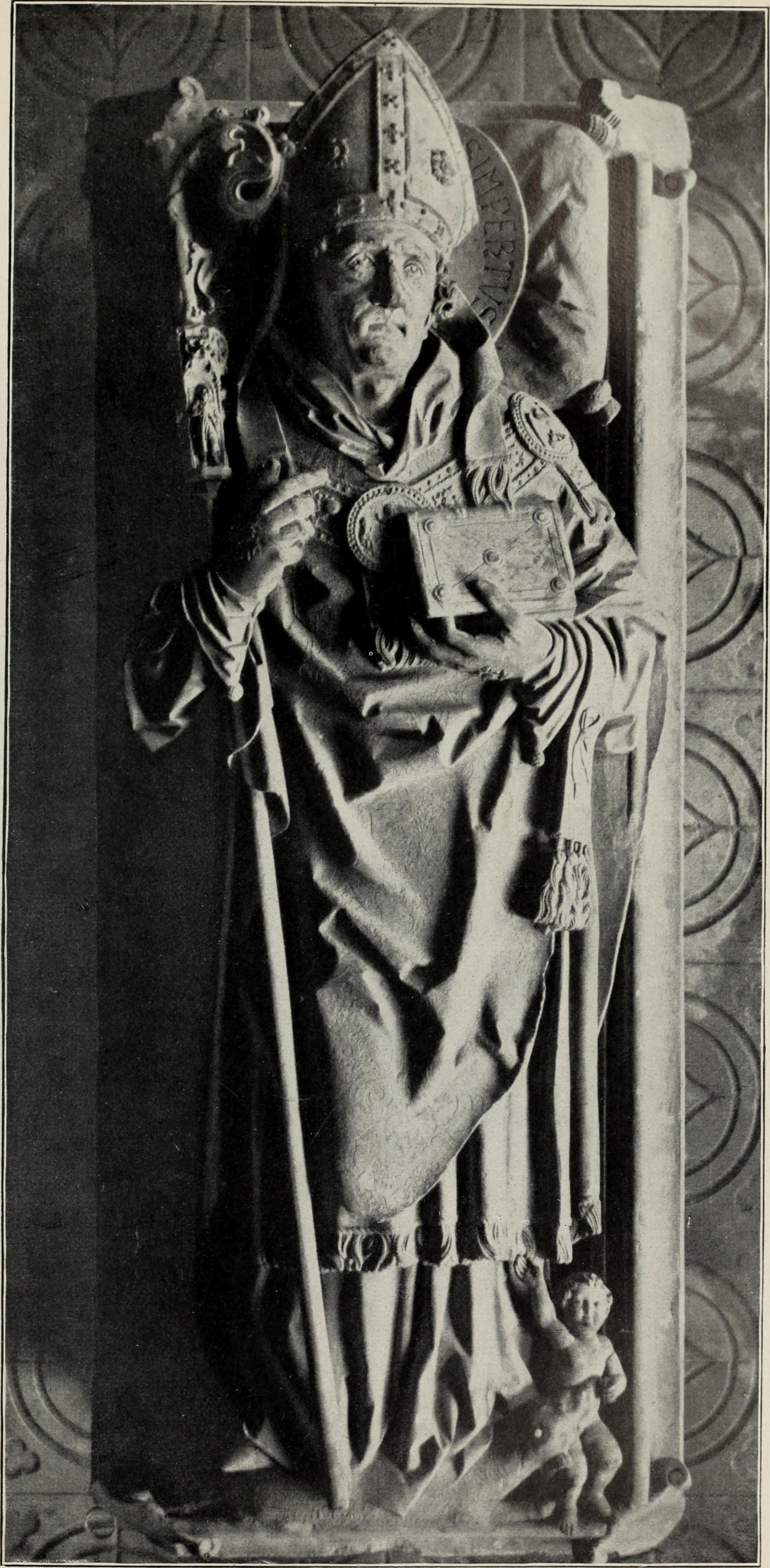
- Cover plate from the tomb of Saint Simpert, Bishop of Augsburg

Bishop of Augsburg
- Born: c. 750
- Died: 13 October 807
- Venerated in: Roman Catholic Church; Eastern Orthodox Church
- Canonized: 6 January 1468 by Pope Paul II
- Feast: 13 October
- Patronage: Augsburg

Simpert (c. 750 – 13 October 807) was an abbot, bishop, and confessor of the late-8th and early-9th centuries, and was supposedly the nephew of Charlemagne. He was educated at Murbach Abbey in Alsace, where he took the Benedictine habit and was elected abbot. In 778, he was appointed bishop of Augsburg by Charlemagne. He consolidated and strengthened the jurisdiction of his bishopric and lived alternately at Neuburg an der Donau, at Staffelsee Abbey, and at Augsburg.

He rebuilt the Basilica of St. Afra's and others. While he was bishop, he remained abbot of Murbach, ruling at the same time the diocese and the monastery. He died on 13 October 807 and was buried at St Afra's church. Since 1624, he has been a secondary patron of Augsburg, his cultus having been approved in 1468.

== Bibliography ==
- Frederick George Holweck, A Biographical Dictionary of the Saints, 1924.

Catholic Church titles
Preceded by Tozzo	Bishop of Augsburg; 778 – 807	Succeeded by Hanto
