= List of bishops of Regensburg =

Catholic bishops of the German diocese

Bishop of Regensburg Episcopus Ratisbonensis Bischof von Regensburg

Catholic
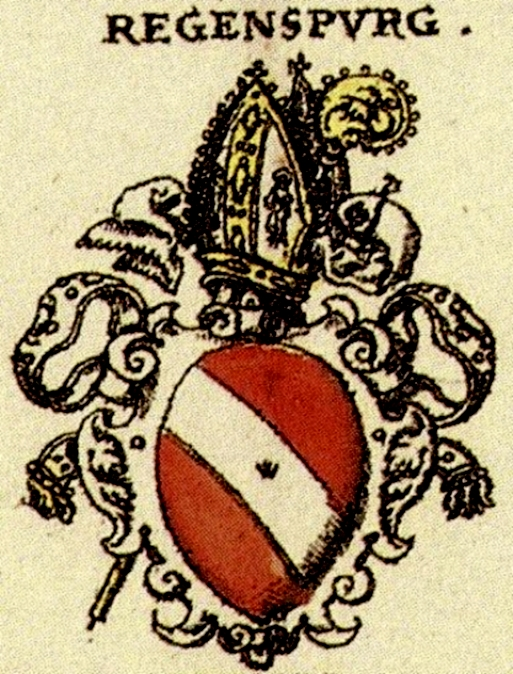
- Incumbent: Josef Graf; 2015

Location
- Country: Germany

Information
- Established: 739
- Diocese: Regensburg
- Cathedral: Regensburg Cathedral

The Bishops of Regensburg (German: Bischöfe von Regensburg; Latin: Episcopi Ratisbonensis or Episcopi Ratisponensis) are bishops of the Roman Catholic Diocese of Regensburg in Bavaria, Germany. The seat of the bishops is Regensburg Cathedral.

== History ==
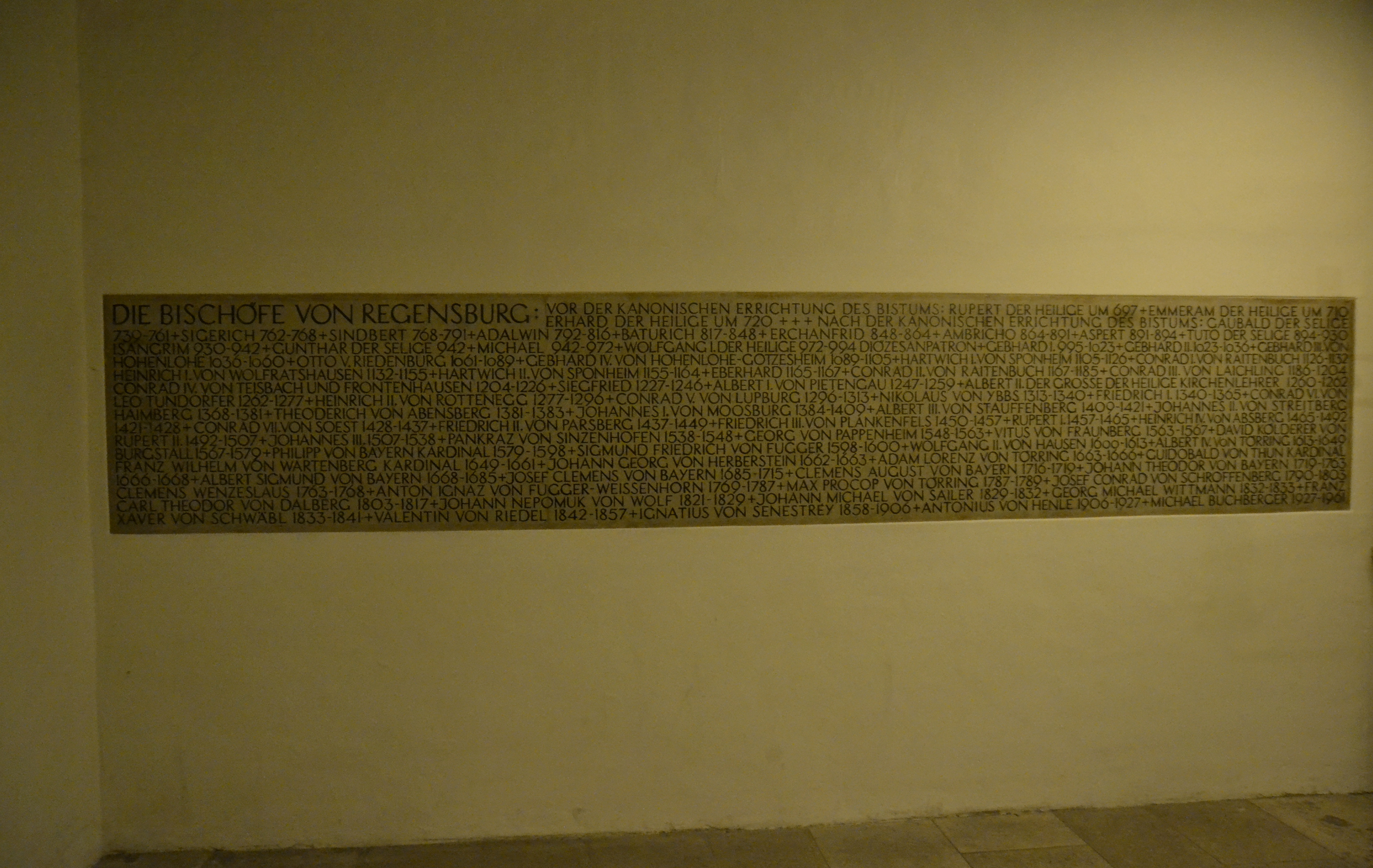
Engraved stone at the Regensburg Cathedral listing Bishops of Regensburg from 697 to 1961

The diocese was founded in 739. The bishops were Princes of the Holy Roman Empire, ruling a territory known as the Prince-Bishopric of Regensburg. They were not among the most powerful Prince-Bishops, due to the existence of other reichsfrei authorities in Regensburg that prevented them from consolidating a major territorial base.

With the dissolution of the Archbishopric of Mainz on that territory's annexation by France in 1802, the Bishopric of Regensburg was elevated to the Archbishopric of Regensburg. It was part of the Principality of Regensburg, ruled by the Prince-Archbishop Karl Theodor Anton Maria von Dalberg. The end of the Holy Roman Empire in 1806 and its aftermath saw the end of the territorial claim of the bishops. With the death of Dalberg in 1817, the archdiocese was downgraded to being a suffragan of the Archbishops of Munich and Freising.

== Before 739 ==
Itinerant bishops before the foundation of the diocese:

- Saint Emmeram (to 652)
- Saint Rupert (about 697) (uncertain)
- Saint Erhard (about 700)

== After the foundation of the diocese ==
Bishops since the foundation of the Diocese of Regensburg in 739:

- Gaubald (739–761)
- Sigerich (762–768)
- Simpert or Sindbert (768–791)
- Adalwin (791–816)
- Baturich (817–847)
- Erchanfried (847–864)
- Ambricho (864–891)
- Aspert (891–893)
- Tuto (893–930)
- Isangrim (930–941)
- Gunther (941)
- Michael (941–972)
- Saint Wolfgang of Regensburg (972–994)
- Gebhard I of Swabia (995–1023)
- Gebhard II of Hohenwart (1023–1036)
- Gebhard III of Hohenlohe (1036–1060)
- Otto of Riedenburg (1061–1089)
- Gebhard IV of Gosham (1089–1105)
- Hartwig I of Spanheim (1105–1126)
- Konrad I (1126–1132)

== Prince-Bishops of Regensburg ==
- Heinrich I of Wolfratshausen (1132–1155)
- Hartwig II of Ortenburg (1155–1164)
- Eberhard the Swabian (1165–1167)
- Konrad II of Raitenbuch (1167–1185)
- Godfrey of Spitzenberg (1185–1186)
- Konrad III of Laichling (1186–1204)
- Konrad IV of Frontenhausen (1204–1227)
- Siegfried (1227–1246)
- Albert I of Pietengau (1247–1260)
- Saint Albertus Magnus (Albert II) (1260–1262)
- Leo Thundorfer (1262–1277)
- Heinrich II von Rotteneck (1277–1296)
- Konrad V von Luppurg (1296–1313)
- Nikolaus von Ybbs (1313–1340)
- Friedrich von Zollern-Nürnberg (1340–1365/1368)
- Heinrich III von Stein (1365–1368)
- Konrad VI von Haimberg (1368–1381)
- Theoderich von Abensberg (1381–1383)
  - Paulus Kölner (1383–1384), elect
- Johann von Moosburg (1384–1409)
- Albert III von Stauf (1409–1421)
- Johann II von Streitberg (1421–1428)
- Konrad VII von Soest (1428–1437)
- Friedrich II von Parsberg (1437–1450)
- Friedrich III von Plankenfels (1450–1457)
- Rupert I (1457–1465)
- Heinrich IV von Absberg (1465–1492)
  - Regiomontanus (1476)
- Rupert II (1492–1507)
- John III of the Palatinate (1507–1538)
- Pankraz von Sinzenhofen (1538–1548)
- Georg von Pappenheim (1548–1563)
- Vitus von Fraunberg (1563–1567)
- David Kölderer von Burgstall (1567–1579)
- Philipp von Bayern (1579–1598)
- Sigmund von Fugger (1598–1600)
- Wolfgang II von Hausen (1600–1613)
- Albert IV von Toerring-Stein (1613–1649)
- Franz Wilhelm von Wartenberg (1649–1661)
- Johann Georg von Herberstein (1662–1663)
- Adam Lorenz von Toerring-Stein (1663–1666)
- Guidobald von Thun (1666–1668)
- Albrecht Sigismund von Bayern (1668–1685)
- Joseph Clemens of Bavaria (1685–1716)
- Clemens August I of Bavaria (1716–1719)
- Johann Theodor of Bavaria (1719–1763)
- Clemens Wenceslaus of Saxony (1763–1769)
- Anton Ignaz von Fugger-Glött (1769–1787)
- Maximilian Prokop von Toerring-Jettenbach (1787–1789)
- Joseph Konrad von Schroffenberg (1790–1803)

== Archbishop of Regensburg ==
- Karl Theodor Anton Maria von Dalberg (1802–1817)
- sede vacante 1817–1821

== Bishops of Regensburg ==
- Johann Nepomuk von Wolf (1821–1829)
- Johann Michael Sailer (1829–1832)
- Georg Michael Wittmann (died in 1833 before the Papal nomination arrived)
- Franz Xaver Schwäbl (1833–1841)
- Valentin Riedel (1842–1857)
- Ignatius von Senestrey (1858–1906)
- Dr. Anton von Henle (1906–1927)
- Dr. Michael Buchberger (1927–1961)
- Dr. Rudolf Graber (1962–1982)
- Manfred Müller (1982–2002)
- Gerhard Ludwig Müller (2002–2012)
- Rudolf Voderholzer (since 2013)

== Auxiliary bishops ==
- Ulrich Aumayer (Aumair), O.F.M. (1456–1468)
- Johann Ludwig von Windsheim, O.S.A. (1468–1480)
- Johann Schlecht, O.S.A. (1481–1500)
- Peter Krafft (1501–1530)
- Johann Kluspeck, C.R.S.A. (1531–1545)
- Johann Zolner (1546–1549)
- Georg Waldeisen (1552–1560)
- Georg Riedl (1561–1566)
- Johann Deublinger (1570–1576)
- Johann Baptist Pichlmair (1579–1604)
- Stephan Nebelmair (1606–1618)
- Otto Heinrich Pachmair (Bachmaier) (1622–1634)
- Sebastian Denick (1650–1671)
- Franz Weinhart (1663–1686)
- Albert Ernst von Wartenberg (1687–1715)
- Gottfried Langwerth von Simmern (1717–1741)
- Franz Joachim Schmid von Altenstadt (1741–1753)
- Johann Georg von Stinglheim (1754–1759)
- Johann Anton von Wolframsdorf (1760–1766)
- Adam Ernst Joseph Bernclau von Schönreith (1766–1779)
- Valentin Anton von Schneid (1779–1802)
- Johann Nepomuk von Wolf (1802–1818) appointed Bishop of Regensberg
- Karl Josef Jerome von Kolborn (1806–1816)
- Georg Michael Wittmann (1829–)
- Bonifaz Kaspar von Urban (1834–1842)
- Sigismund Felix von Ow-Felldorf (1902–1906)
- Johann Baptist Hierl (1911–1936)
- Johannes Baptist Höcht (1936–1950)
- Josef Hiltl (1951–1979)
- Karl Borromäus Flügel (1968–1984)
- Vinzenz Guggenberger (1972–2004)
- Wilhelm Schraml (1986–2001)
- Reinhard Pappenberger (2007)
- Josef Graf (2015)
