= Henry IV of Absberg =

Henry IV of Absburg
- Bishop of Regensburg
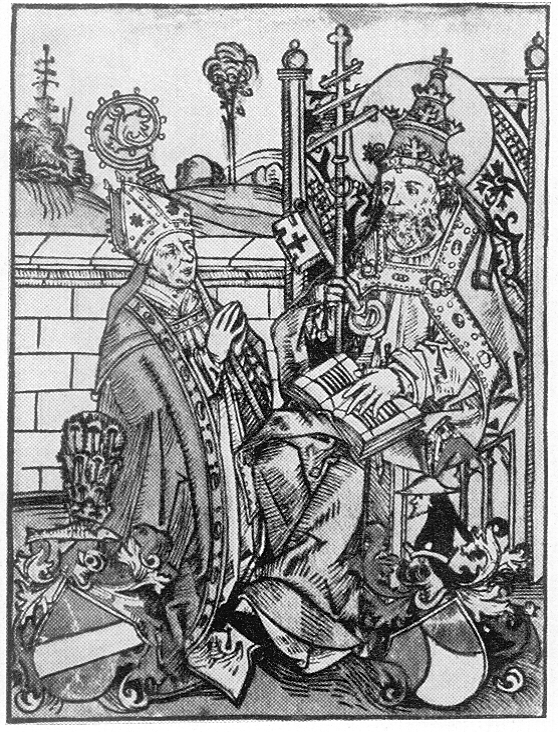
- Woodcut of Henry IV of Asberg as a bishop, kneeling before Saint Peter (Michael Wolgemut, reproduced from Buchberger, 1200 Jahre Bistum Regensburg (1939:45)
- Native name: Heinrich IV. von Absberg
- Church: Catholic Church
- Diocese: Diocese of Regensburg
- In office: 3 January 1466 – 26 July 1492
- Predecessor: Rupert of Palatinate-Mosbach
- Successor: Rupert of Palatinate-Simmern

Orders
- Consecration: 25 May 1466 by Johann Tulbeck

Personal details
- Born: 19 March 1409 Dornhausen (near Theilenhofen), Burgraviate of Nuremberg, Holy Roman Empire
- Died: 26 July 1492 (aged 83)

Henry IV of Asberg (19 March 1409, Dornhausen - 26 July 1492) was a nobleman of the Franconian House of Absberg and clergyman. From 1465 to his death he was bishop of Regensburg.

According to Biedermann (1748), he was the son of Henry of Absberg, Rumberg, Reicheneck and Dornhausen and of Magdalena Seiboldsdorf. He was elected bishop in 1457, but the election was annulled, and Rupert of Palatinate-Mosbach became bishop in his stead. Ruprecht died in 1465, at the age of 32, and Henry became his successor.

As bishop, Henry campaigned against the apocalyptic heresies of the Wirsberg brothers in 1466.

The city of Regensburg fell under the control of the Duke of Bavaria in 1486, and the powers of the prince-bishop were curtailed. Regensburg passed back to the prince-bishop in 1492, following an intervention of Frederick III.

After his death, Henry was succeeded by his coadjutor, Rupert of Palatinate-Simmern. His tomb is located in the side-aisle of Regensburg cathedral.
