= Rupert II =

Rupert II may refer to:

- Rupert II, Count of Laurenburg (died c. 1159)
- Rupert II, Elector Palatine (1325–1398)
- Rupert II of Lubin (1396/1402 – 1431)
- Rupert of Palatinate-Simmern (1461–1507), 45th bishop of Regensburg (with Rupert of Palatinate-Mosbach as Rupert I)
