= Sigismund Felix Freiherr von Ow-Felldorf =

Bishop of Passau (1855–1936)

Sigismund Felix von Ow-Felldorf
- Bishop of Passau
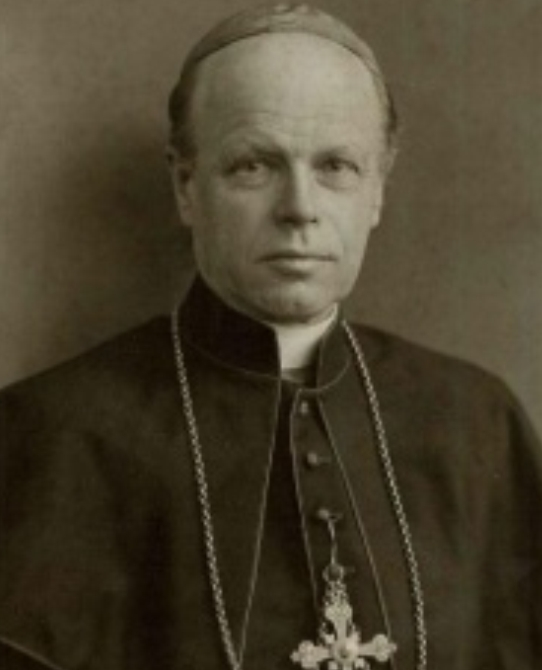
- Church: Catholic Church
- Diocese: Diocese of Passau
- In office: 6 December 1906 – 11 May 1936
- Predecessor: Anton von Henle
- Successor: Simon Konrad Landersdorfer
- Previous posts: Titular Bishop of Arethusa (1902-1906); Auxiliary Bishop of Regensburg (1902-1906)

Orders
- Ordination: 25 July 1884
- Consecration: 24 February 1902 by Ignatius von Senestrey

Personal details
- Born: 18 October 1855 Berchtesgaden, Kingdom of Bavaria, German Confederation
- Died: 11 May 1936 (aged 80) Passau, Gau Bayreuth, German Reich
- Coat of arms

Sigismund Felix Freiherr von Ow-Felldorf (18 October 1855, Berchtesgaden – 11 May 1936, Passau) was a German clergyman who served as the 80th Bishop of Passau from 1907 until his death in 1936.

He was ordained a priest on 25 July 1884 by Bishop Ignatius von Senestrey, and was a parish priest in Regensburg, Germany.

On 11 January 1902, aged 46, he was appointed Auxiliary Bishop of Regensburg, and a month later he was named Titular Bishop of Arethusa. On 18 October 1906, aged 51, he was appointed Bishop of Passau and installed in March 1907. He remained in office until his death on 11 May 1936, aged 80.

He was a priest for 51 years and a bishop for 34 years.

== Sources ==
- Remigius Ritzler; Pirminus Sefrin (1978). Hierarchia catholica Medii et recentioris aevi (in Latin). Vol. VIII (1846–1903). Il Messaggero di S. Antonio. p. 120.
