= John of Palatinate-Mosbach =

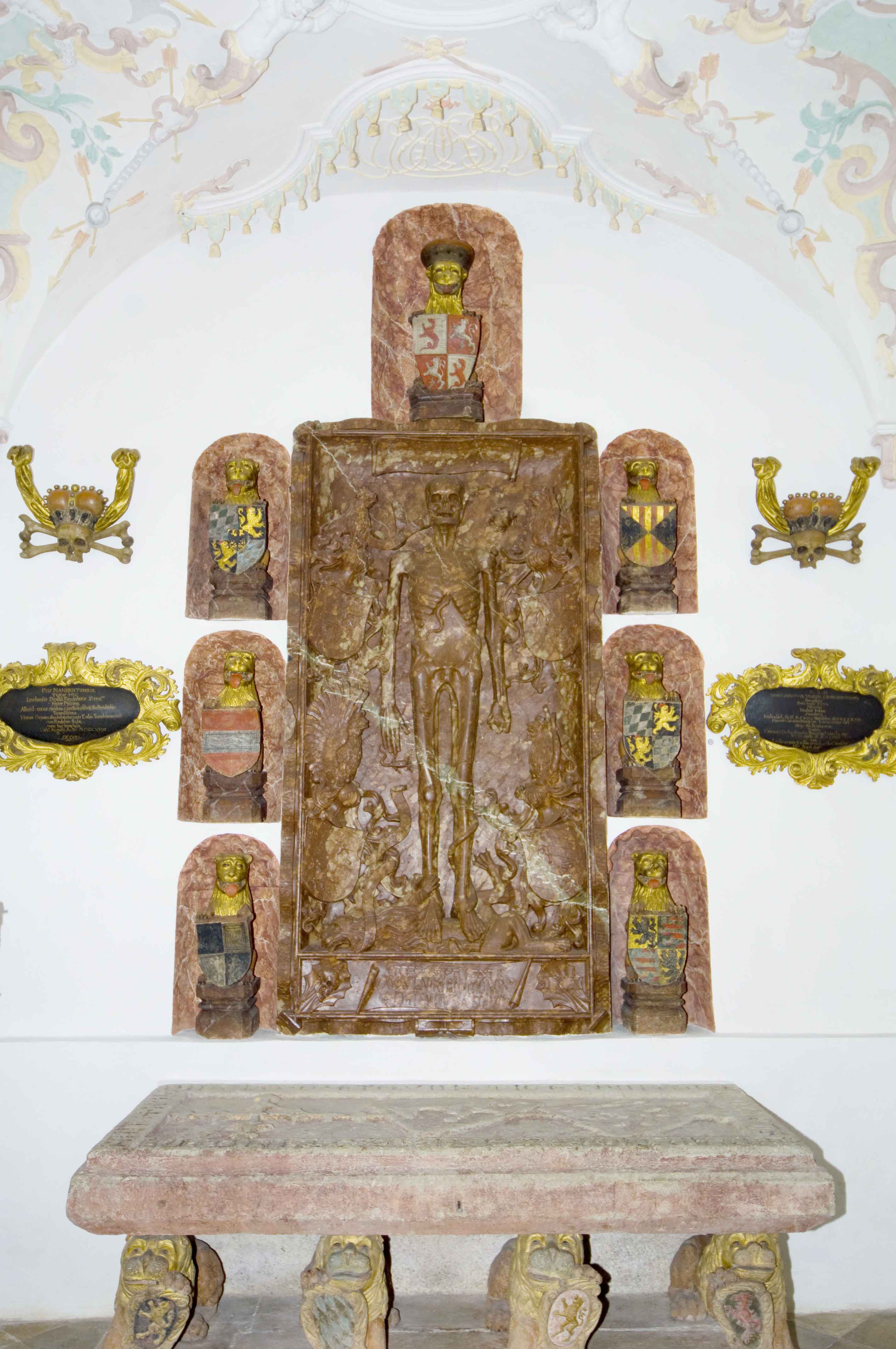
John's monument in Reichenbach

John of Palatinate-Mosbach (1 August 1443 - 4 October 1486, Jerusalem) was a prince of the house of Wittelsbach and Dompropst or canon of Augsburg Cathedral and Regensburg Cathedral.

== Life ==
He was the youngest son of Otto I, Count Palatine of Mosbach (son of Rupert, King of Germany and younger brother of Louis III) and his wife Joanna of Bavaria-Landshut (eldest daughter of Henry XVI, Duke of Bavaria).

Two of John's elder brothers, Albert and Rupert, both became bishops. His family backed John to succeed John II of Werdenberg as bishop of Augsburg and in 1486 sent a delegation to Augsburg to convince the cathedral chapter. However, on advice from Frederick III and other princes, the chapter instead chose Friedrich von Hohenzollern. Hurt and disappointed by this failure, John left Germany on pilgrimage to the Holy Land, accompanied only by his personal servants. He died there in 1486 and was buried in the Cenacle in Jerusalem. There is also a monument to him at Reichenbach Abbey showing a skeleton, in front of which is his father's gravestone. One merchant from Augsburg, Martin Ketzel (died 1507), dedicated his travelogue "Ritterfart über mer gen Jerusalem und zu dem hayligen grab" to John.
