= Albert of Palatinate-Mosbach =

Bishop of Strasbourg (*1440–1506)

Albert of Palatinate-Mosbach or Albert of Bavaria (German: Albrecht von Pfalz-Mosbach or Albrecht von Bayern) (6 September 1440 – 20 August 1506 in Saverne) was a Roman Catholic clergyman who was bishop of Strasbourg from 1478 to 1506.

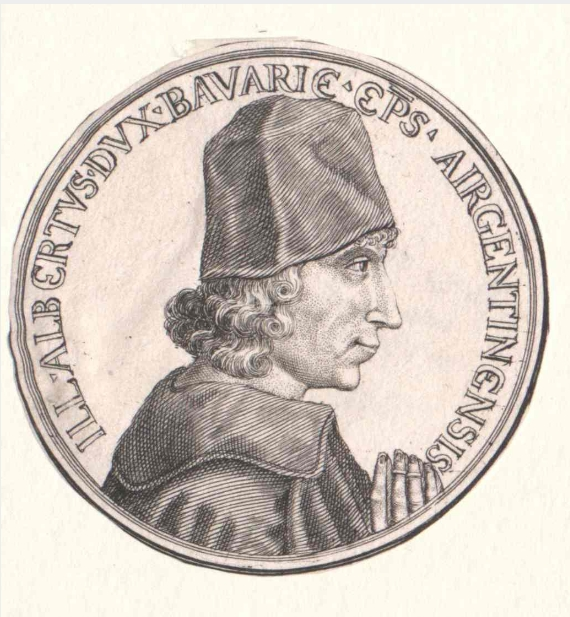
Zeichnung - Bischof Albert von Mosbach

== Family ==
He was descended from the house of Wittelsbach. His parents were Otto I, Count Palatine of Mosbach (son of Rupert, King of Germany and younger brother of Louis III) and his wife Joanna of Bavaria-Landshut (eldest daughter of Henry XVI, Duke of Bavaria). Albert's brother Rupert became bishop of Regensburg, whilst his other brother John became a canon and went on pilgrimage to Jerusalem.

== Life ==
Albert initially served as a canon in the chapter of Strasbourg Cathedral, then as its provost. He was a cousin of his predecessor as bishop Rupert of Palatinate-Simmern but pursued a less confrontational policy than Rupert, making Strasbourg a more uniformly managed territory with clearer, securer borders, fortifying towns and cities and buying back territories. To pay off the high cost of getting his election confirmed by the pope, he put a tax on eating butter during Lent, which was also partly used to fund the casting of cannon - the tax caused some resentment among his prince-bishopric's population but this and other measures improved its financial position.

The Bundschuh movement coincided with this term as bishop and in 1502 he warned his officers, the Unterlandvogt in Alsace and other cities about the movement's resurgence. He wished to set up a common defence network for the cities and rural areas within the prince-bishopric and he put in place surveillance measures. At a meeting in Schlettstadt he also established an alliance.

His relationship with the cathedral chapter was generally good and he involved himself in reform in the diocese, particularly fighting abuses in its monasteries, to which end he convened a diocesan synod in 1482 and carried out visitations in 1492. However, he did not oppose papal indulgences.

He was strongly influenced by Johann Geiler von Kaisersberg, who was a preacher at Strasbourg Cathedral from 1478 and urged Albert to reform the church, and by Jakob Wimpfeling, who lived in Strasbourg from 1501 onwards. In 1506 Albert defended Wimpfeling against pope Julius II, but Albert and Geiler's joint hopes of reform foundered - for example, their plan to dissolve the discredited order of St Stefan (a group of penitential canons) and replace it with a community of clergy failed after a visitation of it had to be abandoned due to the cathedral chapter's opposition.

In 1493 he built an aisle alongside the main nave of the church of Notre-Dame-de-la-Nativité in Saverne as his burial chapel - his gravestone still survives and the aisle has become a chapel dedicated to the Mother of God, but the aisle's tombs were desecrated and destroyed during secularization during the French Revolutionary era.

== Bibliography ==
- (in German) Friedrich Wilhelm Ebeling: Die deutschen Bischöfe bis zum Ende des sechzehnten Jahrhunderts. Volume 2, Leipzig, 1858 S. 479f.
- (in German) Harry Gerber: Albrecht (von Bayern), Bischof von Straßburg. In: Neue Deutsche Biographie (NDB). Volume 1, Duncker & Humblot, Berlin 1953, ISBN 3-428-00182-6, S. 175
