= Lexikon für Theologie und Kirche =

Lexikon für Theologie und Kirche (Lexicon of Theology and the Church; commonly abbreviated LThK) is a German-language Catholic theological encyclopedia. Three editions have appeared so far, all published by Herder-Verlag in Freiburg im Breisgau.

== First edition: 1930 to 1938 ==
The first edition of the Lexikon was edited by Michael Buchberger, bishop of Regensburg, between 1930 and 1938. It was an emended and expanded version of an earlier work in two volumes entitled Kirchliches Handlexikon (Munich, 1904–1912). The editor's goal was to create a modern summa theologiae, i.e. a reference work that would cover all aspects of Catholic teaching, life and practice. This edition contained 10 volumes.

== Second edition: 1957 to 1968 ==
The second edition of the work was prepared between 1957 and 1968 by Josef Höfer and Karl Rahner. At that time, the Catholic Church was experiencing drastic changes, culminating in the Second Vatican Council. As a result, the ten volumes of the encyclopedia and the additional volume containing the index were supplemented by three volumes containing the complete texts of the decrees of the council (in Latin and in German). The complete edition, thus, comprised 14 volumes, and had approximately 22,000 articles.

== Third edition: 1993 to 2001 ==
The third edition was edited by Cardinal Walter Kasper between 1993 and 2001. This edition contains 10 volumes and an additional index volume; altogether it contains approximately 26,000 articles on 8,292 pages. Topics covered include all aspects of Catholic theology, doctrine, history and practice, as well as other subjects related to the Roman Catholic Church and Roman Catholicism in general. Bruno Steimer worked as editor on the third edition.

== See also ==
- Catholic Encyclopedia
- New Catholic Encyclopedia
