= Johannes Frey =

Johannes Frey may refer to:

- Johannes Frey (bishop)
- Johannes Frey (judoka)
