= Ulrich Aumayer =

German Roman Catholic prelate

Most Reverend Ulrich Aumayer
- Auxiliary Bishop of Regensburg; Titular Bishop of Hierapolis in Isauria
- Church: Catholic Church
- Diocese: Diocese of Regensburg
- In office: 1456–1468

Personal details
- Died: 1 July 1468 Regensburg, Germany

Ulrich Aumayer, O.F.M. or Ulrich Aumair (died 1468) was a Roman Catholic prelate who served as Auxiliary Bishop of Regensburg (1456–1468).

== Biography ==
Ulrich Aumayer was ordained a priest in the Order of Friars Minor. On 3 Jul 1456, he was appointed during the papacy of Pope Callixtus III as Auxiliary Bishop of Regensburg and Titular Bishop of Hierapolis in Isauria.. He served as Auxiliary Bishop of Regensburg until his death on 1 Jul 1468.

While bishop, he was the principal co-consecrator of Wilhelm von Reichenau, Bishop of Eichstätt (1464) and Jodok Seitz, Auxiliary Bishop of Augsburg (1464).

== See also ==
- Catholic Church in Germany
