= Johann Ludwig von Windsheim =

Roman Catholic prelate

Most Reverend Johann Ludwig von Windsheim
- Auxiliary Bishop of Regensburg; Titular Bishop of Hierapolis in Phrygia
- Church: Catholic Church
- Diocese: Diocese of Regensburg
- In office: 1468–1480

Personal details
- Died: 19 November 1480 Regensburg, Germany

Johann Ludwig von Windsheim, O.S.A. (died 1480) was a Roman Catholic prelate who served as Auxiliary Bishop of Regensburg (1468–1480) and Titular Bishop of Hierapolis in Phrygia. (1468–1480)

== Biography ==
Ulrich Aumayer was ordained a priest in the Order of Saint Augustine. On 3 Aug 1468, he was appointed during the papacy of Pope Paul II as Auxiliary Bishop of Regensburg and Titular Bishop of Hierapolis in Phrygia. He served as Auxiliary Bishop of Regensburg until his death on 19 Nov 1480.

== See also ==
- Catholic Church in Germany
