= Conrad III (disambiguation) =

Conrad III or Konrad III may refer to:

- Conrad I of Burgundy (c. 925 – 993), numbered Conrad III in his family
- Conrad III, Duke of Bavaria (1052–1055)
- Conrad III, Duke of Carinthia (died 1061)
- Conrad III of Germany (1093–1152)
- Conrad III of Dachau (died 1182)
- Conrad of Wittelsbach (died 1200), archbishop of Salzburg as Conrad III
- Konrad III of Laichling (died 1204), bishop of Regensburg
- Conrad III of Scharfenberg (died 1224), bishop of Speyer
- Conrad III of Jerusalem (1252–1268)
- Conrad of Lichtenberg (died 1299), bishop of Strasbourg as Conrad III
- Conrad III Zoellner of Rotenstein (died 1390)
- Konrad III the Old (died 1412), duke of Oleśnica
- Conrad III of Freiburg (died 1424), Count of Freiburg
- Conrad III of Dhaun (died 1434)
- Konrad III Rudy (died 1503)
- Conrad III Schetz (died 1632)
