= Peter Kramer =

Peter Kramer may refer to:

- Peter D. Kramer (born 1948), American psychiatrist
- Peter Kramer (physicist) (1933–2026), German physicist
- Peter Kramer (priest), German priest

== See also ==
- Piet Kramer (1881–1961), Dutch architect
