= Jodok Seitz =

15th-century Catholic bishop

Most Reverend Jodok Seitz
- Auxiliary Bishop of Augsburg; Titular Bishop of Adramyttium
- Church: Catholic Church
- Diocese: Diocese of Augsburg
- In office: 1460 – 23 January 1471
- Predecessor: Martin Dieminger
- Successor: Jakob Goffredi

Orders
- Consecration: 27 May 1464 by Peter von Schaumberg

Personal details
- Died: 23 January 1471 Augsburg, Germany

Jodok Seitz, O. Praem. (died 23 January 1471) was a Roman Catholic prelate who served as Auxiliary Bishop of Augsburg (1460–1471).

== Biography ==
Jodok Seitz was ordained a priest in the Order of Canons Regular of Prémontré. In 1460, he was appointed during the papacy of Pope Pius II as Auxiliary Bishop of Augsburg and Titular Bishop of Adramyttium. On 27 May 1464, he was consecrated bishop by Peter von Schaumberg, Bishop of Augsburg, with Johannes Frey, Auxiliary Bishop of Freising, and Ulrich Aumayer, Auxiliary Bishop of Regensburg, serving as co-consecrators. He served as Auxiliary Bishop of Augsburg until his death on 23 January 1471.
