= Gerhard Ludwig Müller =

German cardinal of the Catholic Church (born 1947)

His Eminence Gerhard Ludwig Müller
- Cardinal; Prefect Emeritus of the Congregation for the Doctrine of the Faith
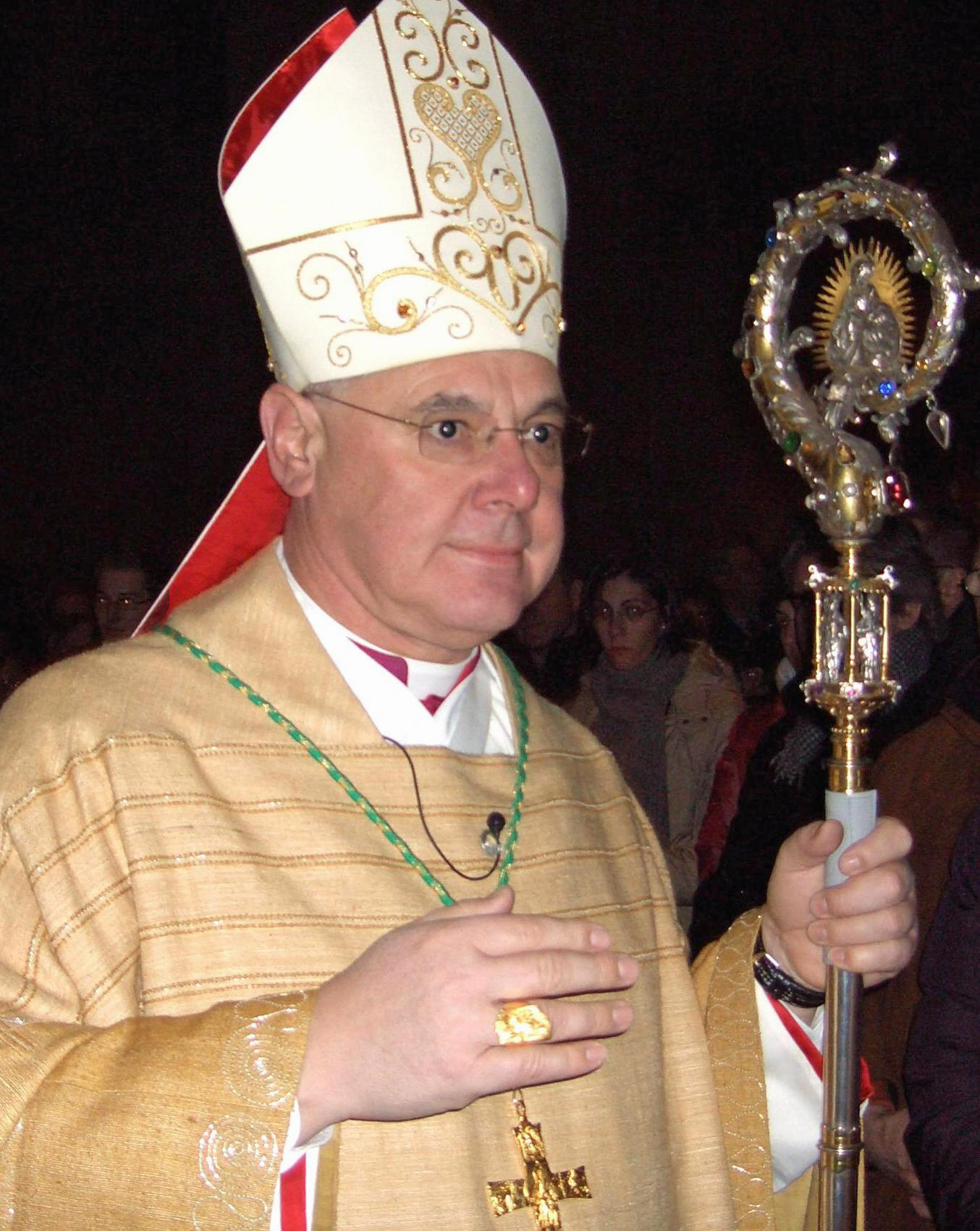
- Müller during Christmas Eve Mass 2006 at Regensburg Cathedral
- Church: Sant'Agnese in Agone
- Appointed: 2 July 2012
- Term ended: 1 July 2017
- Predecessor: William Levada
- Successor: Luis Ladaria Ferrer
- Other post: Cardinal-Priest of Sant'Agnese in Agone
- Previous post: Bishop of Regensburg (2002–2012)

Orders
- Ordination: 11 February 1978 by Hermann Volk
- Consecration: 24 November 2002 by Friedrich Wetter
- Created cardinal: 22 February 2014 by Pope Francis
- Rank: Cardinal-Deacon (2014–2024); Cardinal-Priest (2024–)

Personal details
- Born: 31 December 1947 (age 78) Mainz, Germany
- Denomination: Catholic Church
- Motto: Dominus Jesus (Latin for 'Jesus the Lord') —Romans 10:9

Academic background
- Education: University of Mainz, LMU Munich, University of Freiburg
- Theses: Kirche und Sakramente im religionslosen Christentum. Bonhoeffers Beitrag zu einer ökumenischen Sakramententheologie (1977); Gemeinschaft und Verehrung der Heiligen. Geschichtlich-systematische Grundlegung der Hagiologie (1985)
- Doctoral advisor: Karl Lehmann

Academic work
- Era: 20th–21st century
- Discipline: Catholic theology, Dogmatics, Ecclesiology
- School or tradition: Roman Catholic
- Institutions: LMU Munich; Pontifical Gregorian University; San Damaso Ecclesiastical University, Madrid; Lateran University, Rome; Pontifical Catholic University of Peru; University of Salamanca; University of Santiago de Compostela; University of Lugano; Hochschule für katholische Kirchenmusik und Musikpädagogik Regensburg (Grand Chancellor); Congregation for the Doctrine of the Faith (Vatican)
- Notable works: Katholische Dogmatik, An der Seite der Armen (with Gustavo Gutiérrez)
- Styles
- Reference style: His Eminence
- Spoken style: Your Eminence
- Religious style: Cardinal
- Informal style: Cardinal

Ordination history
History
Episcopal consecration
- Principal consecrator: Friedrich Wetter
- Co-consecrators: Karl Lehmann; Vinzenz Guggenberger; Manfred Müller
Cardinalate
- Elevated by: Pope Francis
Episcopal succession
Bishops consecrated by Gerhard Ludwig Müller as principal consecrator
- Reinhard Pappenberger: 25 March 2007
- Steven J. Lopes: 2 February 2016

Gerhard Ludwig Müller (German: [ˈɡeːɐ̯haʁt ˈluːtvɪç ˈmʏlɐ]; born 31 December 1947) is a German Catholic prelate who served as the Cardinal-Prefect of the Congregation for the Doctrine of the Faith from his appointment by Pope Benedict XVI in 2012 until 2017. Pope Francis elevated him to the rank of cardinal in 2014.

== Early life ==
Müller was born in Finthen, a borough of Mainz, then in Allied-occupied Germany. After graduating from Willigis Episcopal High School in Mainz, he studied philosophy and theology at the University of Mainz, LMU Munich, and the University of Freiburg, West Germany. In 1977, he received his Doctorate in Theology under Karl Lehmann for his thesis on the Protestant theologian Dietrich Bonhoeffer and pursued a Habilitation, qualifying him for a chair in 1985, also under Lehmann, on the theology of the "communion of saints".

== Priestly ministry ==
Müller was ordained as a priest of the Diocese of Mainz, Germany, on 11 February 1978 by cardinal Hermann Volk. He then served as a pastor of three parishes. In 1986, Müller was appointed to the chair of dogmatic theology of LMU Munich, where he remains an honorary professor.

== Episcopate ==
Coat of arms as Bishop of Regensburg

Pope John Paul II appointed Müller bishop of Regensburg, Germany on 1 October 2002. He was ordained to the episcopacy on 24 November 2002, with Friedrich Wetter serving as the principal consecrator; his principal co-consecrators included Karl Lehmann, Vinzenz Guggenberger, and Manfred Müller. Müller chose "Dominus Iesus" ("Jesus is Lord"), from Romans 10:9, as his episcopal motto.

On 20 December 2007, Pope Benedict XVI reappointed Müller to another five years on the Congregation for the Doctrine of the Faith (CDF). On 17 January 2009 he was appointed to the Pontifical Council for Culture. On 12 June 2012, Müller was appointed to the Congregation for Catholic Education for a renewable term of five years and was appointed to the Pontifical Council for Promoting Christian Unity.

In the Conference of German Bishops, Müller was chairman of the Ecumenical Commission, deputy chairman of the Commission of the Doctrine of the Faith, and a member of the World Church Commission. He was also vice chairman of the Association of Christian Churches in Germany (ACK) and led the Verein zur Forderung of the Ostkirchliches Institut Regensburg, an institute for the study of Eastern Orthodox theology based in Regensburg, Germany.

As a personal friend of Pope Benedict XVI, he was mandated to prepare the publication of the Opera Omnia, i.e., a series of books that will collect in a single edition all of Pope Benedict's writings. Müller has written more than 400 works on dogmatic theology, ecumenism, revelation, hermeneutics, the priesthood, and the diaconate.

== Curial service ==
On 2 July 2012, Pope Benedict XVI appointed Müller to a five-year term as the Prefect of the Congregation for the Doctrine of the Faith and made him an archbishop as well. He became ex officio the President of the Pontifical Biblical Commission, the International Theological Commission, and the Pontifical Commission Ecclesia Dei.

Müller said he hoped to halt the "growing polarization between traditionalists and progressives [which] is threatening the unity of the Church and generating strong tensions among its members".

In an interview published on 1 February 2015, Müller objected to the criticism of the church for its mishandling of clerical sexual abuse cases and for its continued condemnation of contraception, same-sex marriage, and declared incapacity to ordain women. He said "Targeted discreditation campaigns against the Catholic Church in North America and also here in Europe have led to clerics in some areas being insulted in public. An artificially created fury is growing here which sometimes reminds one of a pogrom sentiment." His remarks were denounced by a variety of German politicians.

On 24 November 2012, he was appointed a member of the Pontifical Council for Legislative Texts. In November 2012, Müller said that traditionalist and progressive camps that see the Second Vatican Council as breaking with the truth both espouse a "heretical interpretation" of the council and its objectives. What Pope Benedict XVI had described as "the hermeneutic of reform, of renewal in continuity" is, for Müller, the "only possible interpretation according to the principles of Catholic theology."

On 19 February 2014, Müller was appointed a member of the Congregation for the Oriental Churches.

In 2015, Müller described how he viewed the role of the CDF when the pope was not a theologian as Pope Benedict XVI had been. He said: "The arrival of a theologian like Benedict XVI in the chair of St. Peter was no doubt an exception. ... Pope Francis is also more pastoral and our mission at the Congregation for the Doctrine of the Faith is to provide the theological structure of a pontificate." Andrea Tornielli of Vatican Insider criticized Muller for inventing a new role not found in the statutes defining the CDF's role, adding that Muller was making far more public pronouncements than his predecessors were accustomed to.

On 1 July 2017, Pope Francis named Luis Ladaria Ferrer to succeed Müller as Cardinal-Prefect of the CDF. Müller chose to retire rather than accept another Curial position.

Müller criticised the way Pope Francis dismissed him as head of the CDF, calling it "unacceptable". He said that on the last working day of his five-year term, Pope Francis informed him "within a minute" that he would not be reappointed to another term. "He did not give a reason. Just as he gave no reason for dismissing three highly competent members of the CDF a few months earlier." Later that month a report commissioned by the Diocese of Regensburg sharply criticized Müller's handling while bishop there of cases of sexual abuse by priests.

In the context of Pope Francis' encyclical Amoris laetitia and its allowance of divorced Catholics receiving Communion, Müller criticized Francis' papacy, and Latin American theology in general, for lacking theological rigour.

== Cardinalate ==
On 22 February 2014, Pope Francis made him Cardinal-Deacon of Sant'Agnese in Agone. He joined the order of cardinal-priests on 1 July 2024.

Pope Francis named him a member of the Supreme Tribunal of the Apostolic Signatura on 21 June 2021.

He participated as a cardinal elector in the 2025 papal conclave that elected Pope Leo XIV.

== Views ==
=== Amoris laetitia ===
Following the publication of the post-synodal apostolic exhortation Amoris laetitia of Pope Francis, Müller stated that the Pope did not need to be corrected for false doctrine. Interviewed on 9 January 2017, Müller said that Amoris laetitia was "very clear" in its teaching. Müller said that Pope Francis asks priests

to discern the situation of these persons living in an irregular union – that is, not in accordance with the doctrine of the church on marriage – and asks for help for these people to find a path for a new integration into the church according to the condition of the sacraments [and] the Christian message on matrimony.

He said that in Amoris laetitia he "do[es] not see any opposition: On one side we have the clear doctrine on matrimony, and on the other the obligation of the church to care for these people in difficulty." However, in a second interview, Müller was asked whether the teaching reaffirmed in Familiaris consortio of Pope John Paul II, which linked the Eucharist to marriage, remains valid. Pope John Paul II stated that the divorced and civilly remarried were proscribed from the reception of Holy Communion, except possibly when they determine to live "in complete continence". Müller said of this condition that, "Of course, it is not dispensable, because it is not only a positive law of John Paul II, but he expressed an essential element of Christian moral theology and the theology of the sacraments." Müller also stated that "Amoris Laetitia must clearly be interpreted in the light of the whole doctrine of the Church." He has further stated that "I don't like it[;] it is not right that so many bishops are interpreting Amoris Laetitia according to their way of understanding the Pope's teaching. This does not keep to the line of Catholic doctrine."

=== Abortion ===
Müller has criticized politicians who support abortion rights, including US President Joe Biden. He has stated that "To demand abortion as a human right cannot be surpassed in its inhuman cynicism."

=== Doctrinal immutability ===
Müller has defended the immutability of Catholic doctrine from the attempt to adapt it to contemporary lifestyles, which attempt might be described as aggiornamento. He stated that such an approach introduces subjectivism and arbitrariness. In an interview with Die Tagespost, he claimed that placing "lived realities" on the same level as scripture and tradition is "nothing more than the introduction of subjectivism and arbitrariness, wrapped up in sentimental and smug religious terminology." His comments have been interpreted as criticism of the "shadow council" when bishops and experts from Germany, France, and Switzerland met in Rome to discuss how the church could adapt its pastoral approach to contemporary culture, especially contemporary opinions of human sexuality.

=== Liberation theology ===
In an interview by the German daily Frankfurter Allgemeine Zeitung, Müller said that Pope Francis "is not so much a liberation theologian in the academic sense but, as far as pastoral work is concerned, he has close ties with liberation theology's concerns. What we can learn from him is the insight that there is no pastoral work without profound theology and vice versa." In the 1980s, the CDF under then-Cardinal Joseph Ratzinger attacked certain forms of liberation theology as borrowing "from various currents of Marxist thought". During a visit to Peru in 1988, then-professor Müller discussed it with his friend and teacher Gustavo Gutiérrez, regarded as the father of Latin American liberation theology, who convinced him of its orthodoxy. Müller explained that liberation theology focused on orthopraxis, "the correct way of acting in a Christian fashion since it comes from true faith", congruent with the Gospel for the Poor, i. e. "for those on the periphery", to borrow the terminology that Pope Francis had repeatedly used. Müller said: "How can we speak of the love and mercy of God in face of the suffering of so many people who don't have food, water, health care, who don't know how to offer a future to their children. ... This is possible only if we are also willing to be with the people, to accept them as brothers and sisters, without paternalism from on high."

In an October 2023 article for First Things, Müller re-examined Pope Benedict XVI's relationship with liberation theology, arguing that the Church does not reject the goal of liberation, nor a concern for material conditions. He went on arguing that the Holy See condemned liberation theology only as long as it borrowed elements from Marxist and utopian philosophy, while affirming liberation theology to the extent that it sought to help the poor. According to Müller, Gutiérrez's positions were never censored by the Holy See, and he was only asked to modify some of his statements.

=== Pachamama statue ===
Following the 2019 Pachamama statue, Cardinal Müller broke with Pope Francis and defended the assailants who threw a statue of Pachamama into a river. He stated that "The great mistake was to bring the idols into the church, not to put them out."

=== Protestant churches ===
In a speech in October 2011, while quoting Unitatis Redintegratio of the Second Vatican Council regarding ecumenism, Müller stated that "the Catholic Magisterium is far from denying an ecclesial character or an ecclesial existence to 'the separated Churches and Ecclesial Communities of the West'."

In the book Remaining in the Truth of Christ, published together with other cardinals and four Catholic scholars, theological arguments are presented in favour of the Catholic Church's centuries-old resistance to the Byzantine and Orthodox practice of oikonomia, the possibility of remarrying – with the first spouse still alive – after a preparatory period of penance. This practice was introduced in the 11th century by the Byzantine emperors for political reasons, not divine ones.

=== Traditionis custodes ===
Cardinal Müller has been critical of Traditionis custodes, the motu proprio apostolic letter issued by Pope Francis restricting the use of the Tridentine Mass; having authored an analysis of the letter for the online publication The Catholic Thing. Müller has criticised the letter as "harsh" and contrasted the efforts of the Pope to curtail traditionalist Catholics with his response to the German Synodal Path writing, "Instead of appreciating the smell of the sheep, the shepherd here hits them hard with his crook." He also contrasted the suppression of the Tridentine Mass with the supposed introduction of pagan elements within the liturgy at the Amazon Synod held in 2019: "The paganization of the Catholic liturgy […] through the mythologization of nature, the idolatry of environment and climate, as well as the Pachamama spectacle, were rather counterproductive for the restoration and renewal of a dignified and orthodox liturgy reflective of the fulness of the Catholic faith." Müller was also critical of the elements of the document that seek to ascertain the assent of traditionalist Catholics to the legitimacy of the Second Vatican Council, despite the fact that many teachings of the Council are "being heretically denied in open contradiction to Vatican II by a majority of [non-traditionalist] German bishops and lay functionaries (even if disguised under pastoral phrases)."

=== US Leadership Conference of Women Religious ===
In 2012, Müller and the Congregation for the Doctrine of the Faith initiated an investigation of the Leadership Conference of Women Religious. The member congregations of the Conference were ordered to review their statutes and reassess their plans and programs. The investigation was controversial, and was terminated by Pope Francis in April 2015, who "shrewdly let the nuns' case fade from his agenda". The investigation embittered many American Catholics "against what they perceive[d] as heavy-handed tactics by Rome against U.S. sisters who provide critical health care, education and other services for the poor."

=== Criticism of the Synod on Synodality ===
On 7 October 2022 interview to EWTN, Müller harshly criticized the concurrent Synod of Bishops, describing it as an "occupation of the Catholic Church" and a "hostile takeover of the Church of Jesus Christ", whose supporters want the "destruction of the Catholic Church", inviting Catholics to resist such process. In the same interview, he criticized Pope Francis for failing to defend Cardinal Joseph Zen from persecution by Chinese authority.

=== Criticism of Pope Francis ===
On 27 October 2023, Müller wrote an opinion piece on the ecumenical religious journal First Things, stating that "to teach contrary to the apostolic faith would automatically deprive the pope of his office", quoting the 16th-century Cardinal Robert Bellarmine in support and arguing that "We must all pray and work courageously to spare the Church such an ordeal".

In a November 7, 2023 interview to LifeSiteNews, stated that Pope Francis "has already uttered plenty of material heresies", but argued that he had not ceased to be the Pope, since formal heresy could only be deemed so by the church and thus by the Pope himself. In the same interview, he also accused Cardinal Víctor Manuel Fernández, recently appointed head of the Dicastery for the Doctrine of the Faith, of material heresy.

=== Eucharist ===
In 2002, Müller published the book Die Messe - Quelle des christlichen Lebens (The Mass - Source of Christian Life, St. Ulrich Verlag, Augsburg). In the book, he writes: "In reality, "Body and Blood of Christ" do not mean the material components of the man Jesus during His lifetime or in His transfigured corporeality. Rather, body and blood here mean the presence of Christ in the sign of the medium of bread and wine, which [presence] is made communicable in the here and now of sense-bound human perception."

=== Homosexuality ===
Müller considers homophobia to be "an invention, a tool of totalitarian domination over the mind" and "a deception used to threaten people", even though homosexuality remains a taboo subject that is prosecuted in many countries.

He also stated that: "There is no such thing as 'homosexuals' as a category. There are real people who have certain tendencies, and there are temptations."

=== Manifesto of Faith ===
In February 2019, Müller issued a "Manifesto of Faith" to Catholic media outlets. It is viewed as critical of some aspects of Pope Francis Papacy. For the most part the manifesto represents a re-stating of the church teachings, such as celibacy for priests and the church's lack of authority to ordain women to the priesthood. One section appeared to repudiate Pope Francis's effort to open, in some cases, communion to divorced and remarried Catholics.

=== Clerical sexual abuse ===
In 2012, Survivors Network for those Abused by Priests criticized Müller's appointment to the CDF because he had reinstated Peter Kramer in parish ministry after Kramer was convicted in 2000 of sexually abusing children. Kramer had completed court-ordered therapy. Müller did not inform those in Kramer's new parish of his past history. Müller had apologized in 2007 for mishandling the case.

In 2016, Fritz Wallner, a former chair of the lay diocesan council in Regensburg, Germany, alleged that Müller as Bishop of Regensburg had "systematically" thwarted the investigation of abuse in the "Regensburger Domspatzen" boys' choir. Georg Ratzinger, Pope Benedict XVI's brother, led the choir from 1964 to 1994. Müller insisted that neither the church nor its bishops were responsible for abusers. In February 2012, he said that "if a schoolteacher abuses a child, it is not the school nor the Ministry of Education that are to blame." He maintained that only the perpetrator is guilty. In 2016, a commission of 12 members was instituted to address the history of abuse and its cover-up in the boys' choir, a move critics viewed as long overdue. Wallner called for the church to purge any person associated with Müller, who had overseen the church's response to the allegations. In July 2017, a comprehensive report commissioned by the Diocese of Regensburg on abuse at the boys choirs said that Müller had "clear responsibility for the strategic, organizational and communicative weaknesses" of the church's response when the abuses were first reported.

Müller was also included in a suit in France for his handling of the case of Cardinal Philippe Barbarin, Archbishop of Lyon. Barbarin was eventually acquitted on appeal in June 2020.

=== Society of Saint Pius X ===
On 26 June 2017, Bishop Bernard Fellay, the then Superior General of the Society of Saint Pius X, received a letter dated 6 June from Cardinal Gerhard Ludwig Müller, Prefect of the Congregation for the Doctrine of the Faith. The prelate asked the acceptance of teachings of the Second Vatican Council and post-conciliar period as a minimum requirement for the papal recognition of the Fraternity.

In February 2026, Müller criticized the Society of Saint Pius X for plan to consecrate bishops without papal approval.

== Honors ==
=== Orders ===
- Holy See: Equestrian Order of the Holy Sepulchre of Jerusalem (OESSH)
- (Kingdom of the Two Sicilies) House of Bourbon-Two Sicilies: Bailiff Knight Grand Cross of Justice of the Sacred Military Constantinian Order of Saint George of the branch of Infante Carlos, Duke of Calabria

=== Academia ===
- Poland: Honorary Doctorate from the Catholic University of Lublin in September 2004, in recognition of his outstanding scientific and didactic activity
- Peru: Honorary Doctorate from the Pontificia Universidad Católica del Perú on 24 September 2008

=== Other ===
- Bavaria, Germany: Federal Cross of Merit First Class awarded by Bavarian Minister-President Horst Seehofer on 28 May 2009

== See also ==
- Cardinals created by Francis
- Ecclesiastical response to Catholic sexual abuse cases
  - Parish transfers of abusive Catholic priests

== Bibliography ==
- Gerhard Ludwig Müller, Das Original des plautinischen Persa, 1957. OCLC 491351217
- Gerhard Ludwig Müller, Bonhoeffers Theologie der Sakramente, Knecht, Frankfurt am Main, 1979. OCLC 720765353 (thesis)
- Gerhard Ludwig Müller, Gemeinschaft und Verehrung der Heiligen: Geschichtlich-systematische Grundlegung der Hagiologie, Herder, Freiburg [im Breisgau], 1986. OCLC 15486627 (doctoral dissertation)

Catholic Church titles
Preceded by Manfred Müller	Bishop of Regensburg; 2002–2012	Succeeded by Rudolf Voderholzer
Preceded by William Levada	Prefect of the Congregation for the Doctrine of the Faith; 2012–2017	Succeeded by Luis Ladaria Ferrer
Preceded by William Levada	President of the Pontifical Commission Ecclesia Dei; 2012–2017	Succeeded by Luis Ladaria Ferrer
Preceded by William Levada	President of the Pontifical Biblical Commission; 2012–2017	Succeeded by Luis Ladaria Ferrer
Preceded by William Levada	President of the International Theological Commission; 2012–2017	Succeeded by Luis Ladaria Ferrer
Preceded by Lorenzo Antonetti	Cardinal Deacon of Sant'Agnese in Agone; 2014–present	Incumbent
