= Vinzenz Guggenberger =

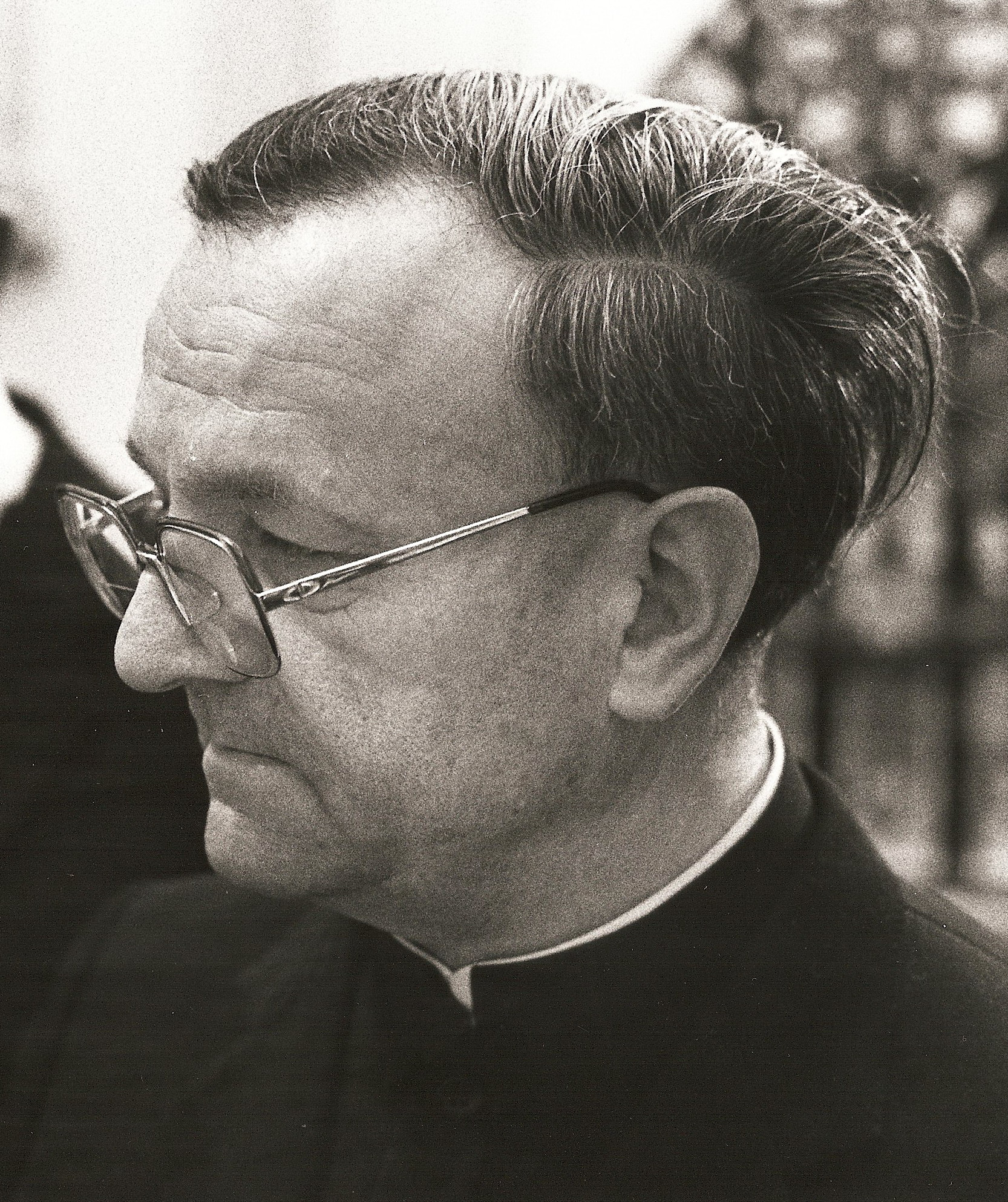
Vinzenz Guggenberger

Coat of arms of Vinzenz Guggenberger.

Vinzenz Guggenberger (March 21, 1929 – July 4, 2012) was the Roman Catholic titular bishop of Abziri and auxiliary bishop of the Roman Catholic Diocese of Regensburg, Germany.

Ordained in 1953, Guggenberger was named bishop in 1972 and retired in 2004.
