= Sigmund Fugger von Kirchberg und Weißenhorn =

German cleric

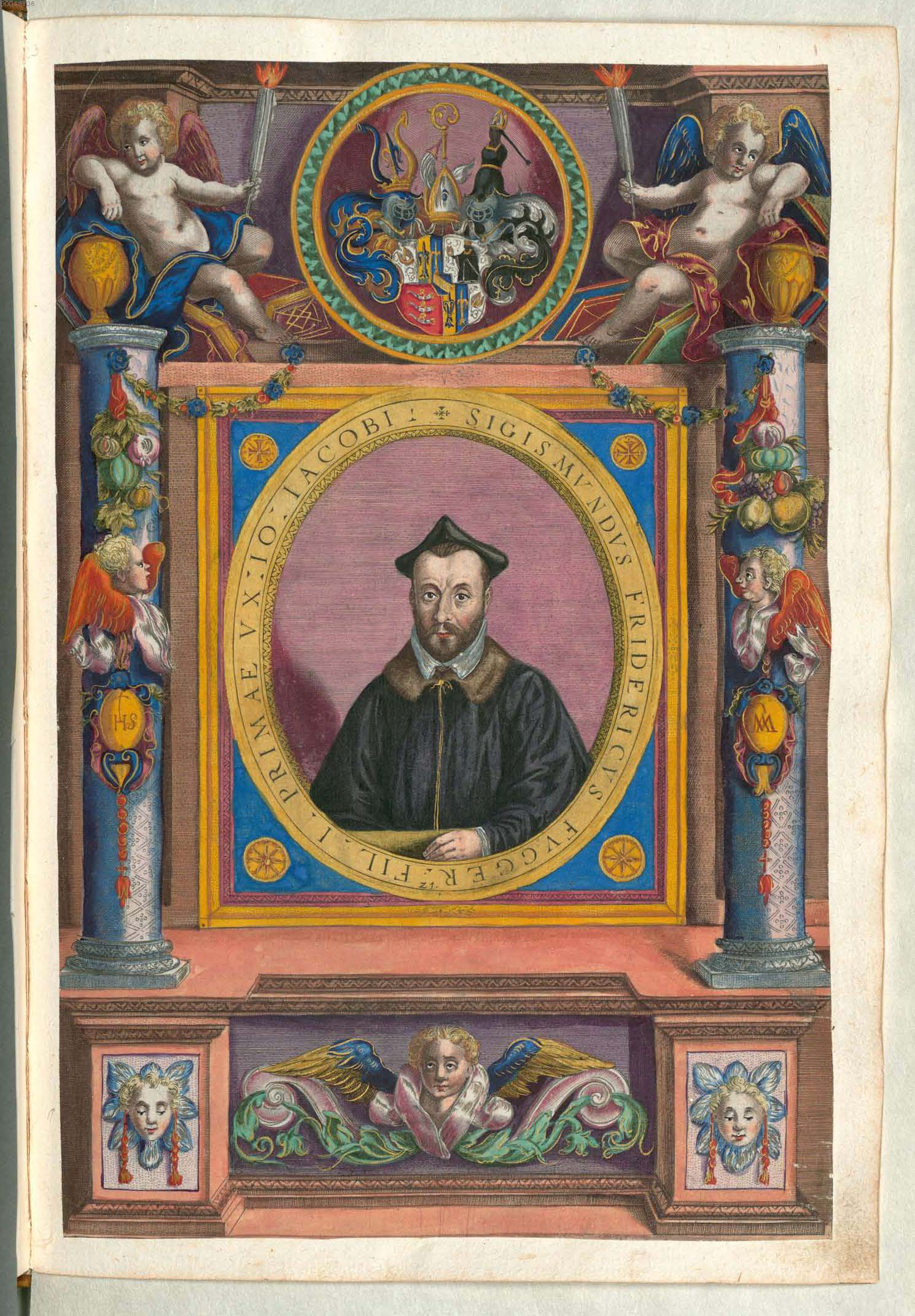
Sigmund Fugger von Kirchberg und Weißenhorn - coloured copperplate from Fuggerorum et Fuggerarum imagines, 1618.

Sigmund Friedrich Fugger von Kirchberg und Weißenhorn (1542 - 15 November 1600) was a German cleric of the Fugger family, most notable as bishop of Regensburg from 2 July 1598 to 1600.

== Life ==
A son of the businessman and humanist Hans Jakob Fugger (born 23 December 1516) and his wife Ursula von Harrach (1522–1554), Sigmund's brothers included religious dignitaries, along with Karl and Ferdinand (who were colonels in the Spanish army) and Maximilian (a Komtur in the German orders of chivalry). He became bishop of Regensburg in 1598, taking on the bishopric when it was plagued by war, debt and bad harvests. He tried to continue the reforming work of Jakob Miller, who had from 1587 to 1597 reformed the bishopric for the bishop and cardinal Philip Wilhelm. In accordance with the Council of Trent's demands for reform, Sigmund urged the laity in his diocese to go frequently to confession, rigorously enforced priestly celibacy and monitored religious education in the diocese's parishes. He died of a kidney stone.

== Bibliography ==
- (in German) Michael Buchberger (Hrsg.): 1200 Jahre Bistum Regensburg. Regensburg 1939, S.54.
- (in German) Karl Hausberger: Geschichte des Bistums Regensburg. Band 1: Mittelalter und frühe Neuzeit. Regensburg 1989, S. 329f.
- (in German) Josef Staber: Kirchengeschichte des Bistums Regensburg. Regensburg 1966, S. 128f.
