= Kißlegg =

- Municipality
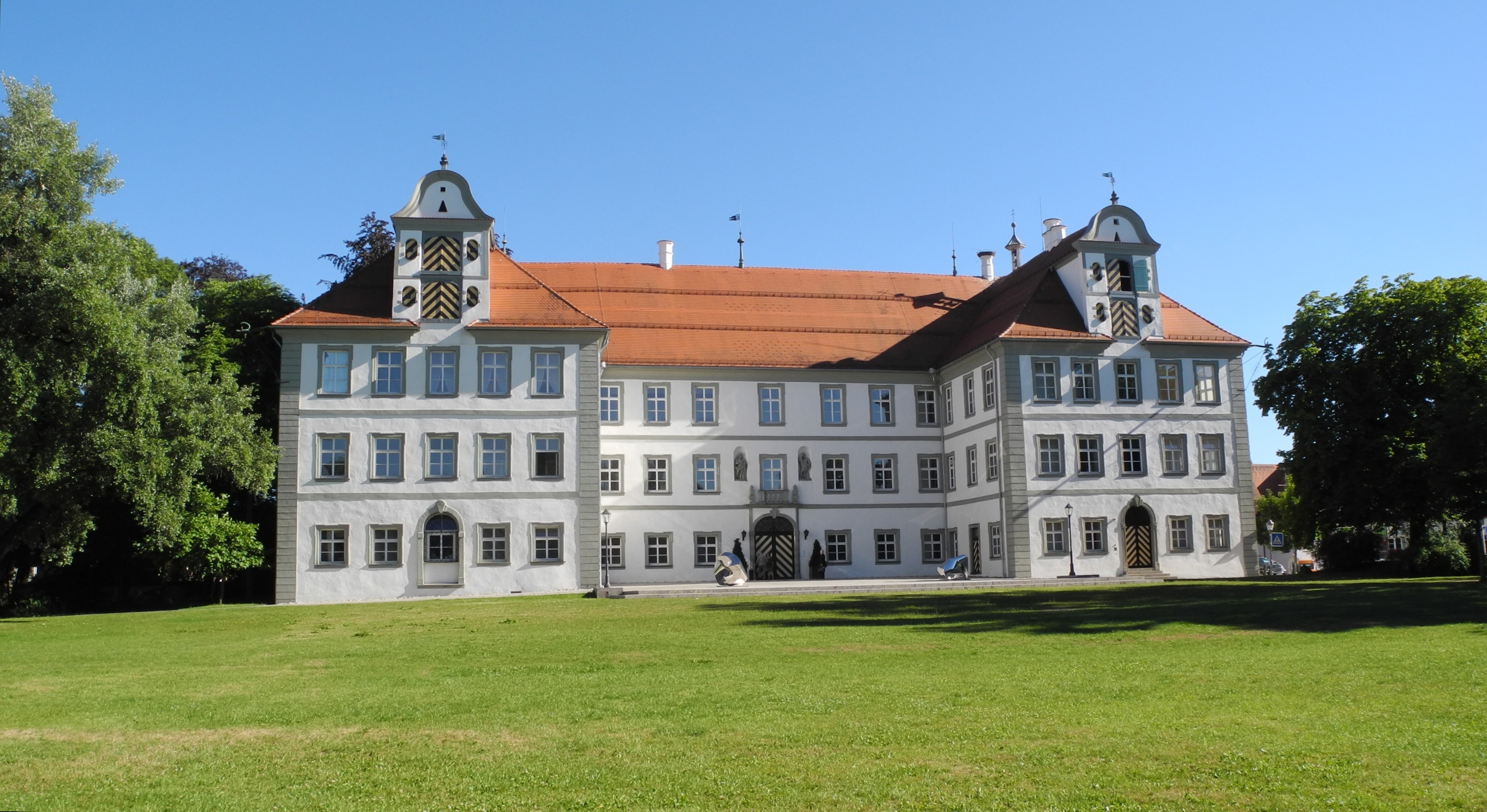
- New Palace

- Coat of arms

- Location of Kißlegg within Ravensburg district
- Interactive map of Kißlegg
- Location within Germany Location within Baden-Württemberg
- Coordinates: 47°47′24″N 09°53′03″E
- Country: Germany
- State: Baden-Württemberg
- Admin. region: Tübingen
- District: Ravensburg

Government
  - Mayor (2020–28): Dieter Krattenmacher

Area
  - Total: 92.40 km^{2} (35.68 sq mi)
- Elevation: 661 m (2,169 ft)

Population (2025-12-31)
  - Total: 9,579
  - Density: 103.7/km^{2} (268.5/sq mi)
- Time zone: UTC+01:00 (CET)
  - Summer (DST): UTC+02:00 (CEST)
- Postal codes: 88353
- Dialling codes: 07563
- Vehicle registration: RV
- Website: www.kisslegg.de

Kißlegg (Kisslegg) is a town in the district of Ravensburg in Baden-Württemberg in Germany. Kißlegg is not far from the village of Vogt.

== Notable people ==
- Oskar Farny (1891–1983), businessman and politician
- Jakob Miller (1550–1597), Catholic theologian

== Demographics ==
Population development:

Year	Inhabitants
1839	2,385
1847	2,422
1877	2,765
1896	3,068
1912	3,687
1933	3,830
1939	3,869
1946	4,024
1950	4,024
1961	4,576
1971	5,187
1980	5,708
1990	6,509
2000	6,892
2010	6,786
