= Jakob Miller =

German Catholic reformist theologian (1550-1597)

Jakob Miller (also spelled Jacob Myller or Müller; 1550 - 11 December 1597) was a Catholic reformist theologian, provost and administrator of the diocese of Regensburg.

== Life ==
Miller was born in Kißlegg, Allgäu. He studied at the Germanicum in Rome and in 1578 was made a cathedral-preacher in Konstanz, then on his deposition from that post in 1585 as visitor to the bishopric of Konstanz. From 1586 he was spiritual overseer of the diocese of Regensburg. In Regensburg Miller tried to set up a Jesuit college, wrote new diocesan constitutions and enforced the decisions of the Council of Trent in the diocese. In 1592 he was made the first mitred provost of Regensburg, since the bishop Philipp of Bavaria was still in his minority. He died in Regensburg, aged about 47.

Moritz von Ilberg wrote:

Canon Miller was the spearhead of the tridentine-minded party in the Regensburg cathedral chapter and so of great importance for the support of bishop Philip of Bavaria (a son of William V) for the Tridentine reforms ... Miller was certainly of great significance to the bishop, as the city was almost completely in Lutheran hands.

Miller's extensive literary works include Ornatus ecclesiasticus: hoc est: compendium praecipuarum rerum, quibus quaevis rite decenterque compositae exornari … (Verlag Berg, München 1591), written in German and Latin and describing church furniture.

== Bibliography ==
- (in German) Miller, Jakob. In: Neue Deutsche Biographie (NDB). Band 17. Duncker & Humblot, Berlin 1994, S. 521 f.
- (in German) Karl Hausberger, Das Bistum Regensburg. Seine Geschichte, Regensburg 2004, 109.
- (in German) Karl Hausberger, Geschichte des Bistums Regensburg, Bd. 1: Mittelalter und frühe Neuzeit, Regensburg 1989, 326f.
