= Konrad III of Laichling =

Bishop of Regensburg

Konrad III of Laichling (died April 23, 1204) was the 25th Bishop of Regensburg from 1186 to 1204.

In 1189, Konrad III participated in the Third Crusade until 1191. In 1197, he set out again in the Henry VI's crusade. However, the death of the emperor made him return home. Later on, he supported Philip of Swabia as a pretender to the throne. Expansions of territory by Louis I, Duke of Bavaria led to a feud with Bishop Konrad III, in which the Bishopric and its ecclesiastical goods were severely devastated.

== Bibliography ==
- Buchberger, Michael (1939). 1200 Jahre Bistum Regensburg (in German). Regensburg.
- Staber, Josef (1966). Kirchengeschichte des Bistums Regensburg (in German). Regensburg.
