= Peter Kramer (priest) =

German Catholic priest

Peter Kramer is a German Catholic priest who sexually abused children in the diocese of Regensburg.

== Early life and ordination ==
Kramer was previously an auto mechanic, and he received a late ordination in 1997 after Abitur in Fockenfeld. He was then stationed in the locality of Viechtach.

== Abuse trial ==
=== 1999 indictment ===
Kramer was removed from ministry two years later, after the local bishop was alerted that he had abused two boys near his parish. According to the judge who issued Kramer's indictment in 1999, Archbishop Gerhard Ludwig Müller's opinions were not given by him (as alleged by the court), but by the diocese in the person of a therapist chosen by the priest. In 2000, Kramer was convicted in a non-public trial and was allowed to just serve a sentence of three years probation he was ordered to go to therapy and not work to with children during the probation.

=== 2004 legal memorandum ===
A legal officer of the diocese, immediately after a conversation with the judge at court on 20 February 2004, issued a memorandum barring Kramer from pastoral care and contact with children. Kramer had been caught violating his court-ordered probation by serving in a parish with children starting in February 2001. According to the guidelines of the German Bishops' Conference, in 2004 Kramer was considered a pedophile had been regarded as 2004 according to reports not pedophiles. As provided for in paragraph 12, "2. After serving his sentence the offender no tasks are assigned to more that get him in connection with children and adolescents."

=== New allegations in 2007 ===
On 30 August 2007, Kramer was arrested on suspicion of further sexual abuse. Four weeks later, the Nuremberg Higher Regional Court declared that the judge in Viechtach had warned against reassigning the convicted priest to the youth ministry; however, it also said its report should not have official status, but serve as an opinion. Kramer was then tried and convicted.

=== Role of Bishop Ludwig Müller ===
In September 2007 allegations against Bishop Gerhard Ludwig Müller surfaced after the Passau Neue Presse revealed at the end of July that former chaplain "PK", convicted of sexual abuse in 2000, had been reassigned as a parish administrator in the autumn of 2004 without informing the affected community of his background. The diocese defended its actions on the basis of an opinion by the priest's therapist, avowing that his patient had recovered and he had no concerns about a reassignment; in addition, the court-imposed probationary period had passed without any further infractions.
