= Kirchliches Handlexikon =

Kirchliches Handlexikon: ein Nachschlagebuch über das Gesamtgebiet der Theologie und ihrer Hilfswissenschaften is a two-volume book published in parts in Munich in 1904–12. It was compiled "unter Mitwirkung zahlreicher Fachgelehrten in Verbindung mit den Professoren Karl Hilgenreiner, Joh. B. Nisius, S.J., und Joseph Schlecht, hrsg. von Professor Michael Buchberger". The publisher was Allgemeine Verlags-Gesellschaft m.b.H.

== Sources ==
- Holweck, F. G., A Biographical Dictionary of the Saints. St. Louis, MO: B. Herder Book Co. 1924.
