= Jetzendorf =

- Municipality
- Coat of arms

- Location of Jetzendorf within Pfaffenhofen a.d.Ilm district
- Interactive map of Jetzendorf
- Location within Germany Location within Bavaria
- Coordinates: 48°25′N 11°25′E
- Country: Germany
- State: Bavaria
- Admin. region: Oberbayern
- District: Pfaffenhofen a.d.Ilm

Government
  - Mayor (2024–30): Tobias Endres

Area
  - Total: 21.74 km^{2} (8.39 sq mi)
- Elevation: 481 m (1,578 ft)

Population (2025-12-31)
  - Total: 3,116
  - Density: 143.3/km^{2} (371.2/sq mi)
- Time zone: UTC+01:00 (CET)
  - Summer (DST): UTC+02:00 (CEST)
- Postal codes: 85305
- Dialling codes: 08137
- Vehicle registration: PAF
- Website: www.jetzendorf.de

Jetzendorf (German pronunciation: [ˈjɛtsn̩ˌdɔʁf]) is a municipality in the district of Pfaffenhofen in Bavaria in Germany.
