= Rudolf Voderholzer =

His Excellency Rudolf Voderholzer
- Bishop of Regensburg
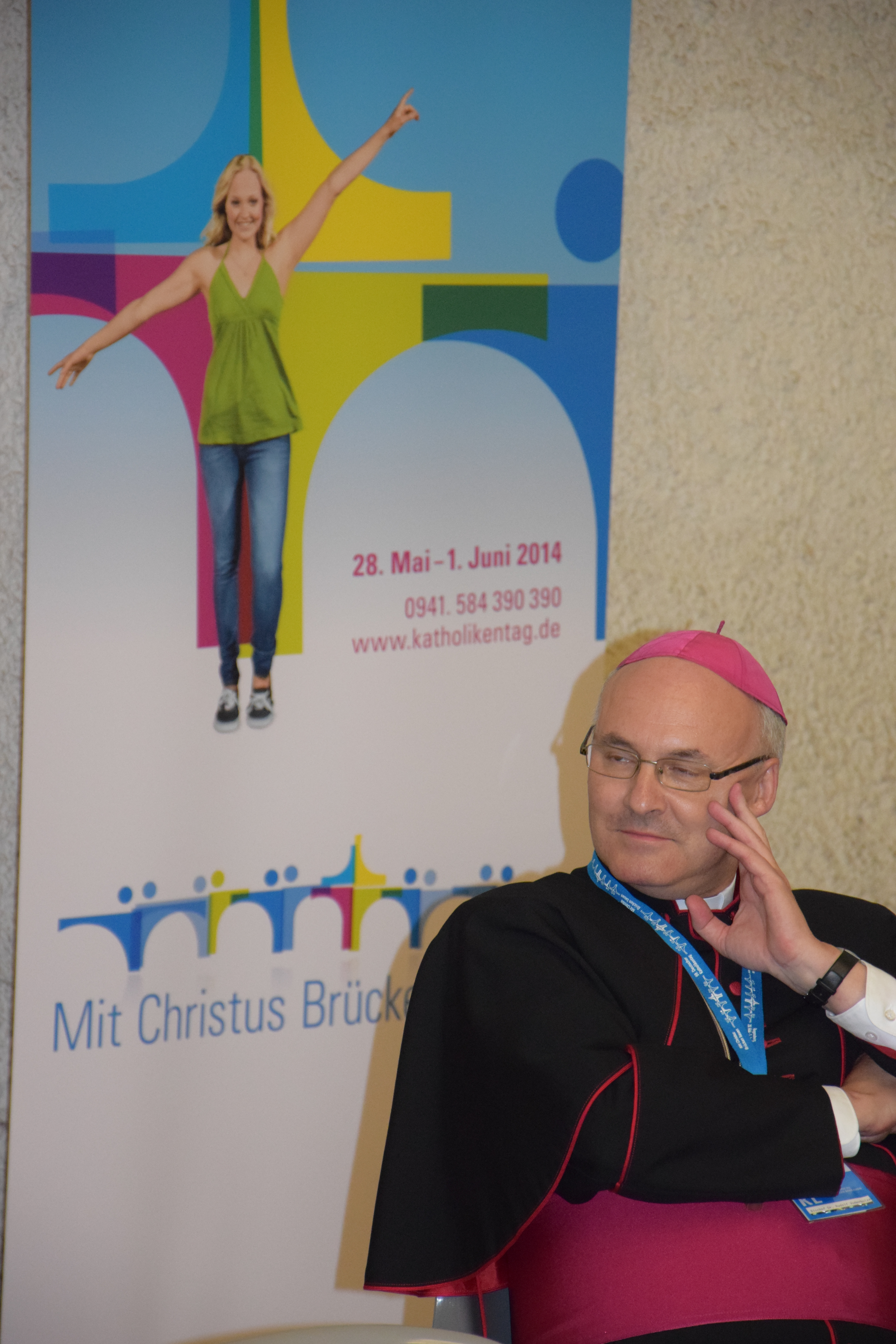
- Rudolf Voderholzer (2014)
- Church: Roman Catholic
- Diocese: Diocese of Regensburg
- Installed: 6 December 2012
- Predecessor: Gerhard Ludwig Müller

Orders
- Ordination: 17 June 1987 by Friedrich Wetter
- Consecration: 26 January 2013 by Reinhard Marx

Personal details
- Born: 9 October 1959 (age 66) Munich, West Germany
- Coat of arms

Rudolf Voderholzer (9 October 1959) is a prelate of the Roman Catholic Church. He is bishop of Regensburg since 2012.

== Life ==
Born in Munich, Voderholzer studied at LMU Munich where he received an MA in 1985 and a diploma in theology in 1986. He was ordained to the priesthood on 17 June 1987 by Friedrich Cardinal Wetter serving in Munich and Freising. He worked as a chaplain in Traunreut, Haar and Zorneding. In 1992, he became an assistant at LMU Munich to Gerhard Ludwig Müller, professor in Dogmatic theology, acquiring a doctorate in theology in 1997. In 2004, he finished his habilitation period, and that same year he started working in the department for belief- and religionsciences and philosophy at the University of Fribourg, where he was head of department from 2004 till 2005.

From 2005 till 2013, he was professor of Dogmatics and history of dogma at the theological faculty of the University of Trier.

On 6 December 2012, he was appointed bishop of Regensburg. Voderholzer received his episcopal consecration on 26 January 2013, from Reinhard Cardinal Marx, archbishop of Munich and Freising, with the former bishop of Regensburg, Gerhard Ludwig Müller; and the bishop of Plzeň, František Radkovsky, serving as co-consecrators. He chose the motto Christus in vobis spes gloriae.

In 2017, it was reported that at least 547 boys in the prestigious Domspatzen choir were physically abused, sexually abused or both between the years 1945 and 1992 and that Voderholzer announced plans to offer victims compensation of between 5,000 and 20,000 euros ($5,730 US and $22,930) each by the end of the year.
