= Johannes Frey (bishop) =

German Roman Catholic prelate

Most Reverend Johannes Frey
- Auxiliary Bishop of Freising; Titular Bishop of Saldae
- Church: Catholic Church
- Diocese: Diocese of Freising
- In office: 1457–1474

Personal details
- Died: 8 April 1474 Freising, Germany

Johannes Frey, O.F.M. (died 1474) was a Roman Catholic prelate who served as Auxiliary Bishop of Freising (1457–1474).

== Biography ==
Johannes Frey was ordained a priest in the Order of Friars Minor. On 19 Aug 1457, he was appointed during the papacy of Pope Callixtus III as Auxiliary Bishop of Freising and Titular Bishop of Saldae. He served as Auxiliary Bishop of Freising until his death on 8 Apr 1474. While bishop, he was the principal co-consecrator of Wilhelm von Reichenau, Bishop of Eichstätt (1464); and Jodok Seitz, Auxiliary Bishop of Augsburg (1464).

== See also ==
- Catholic Church in Germany
