= Ignatius von Senestrey =

- Bishop of Regensburg
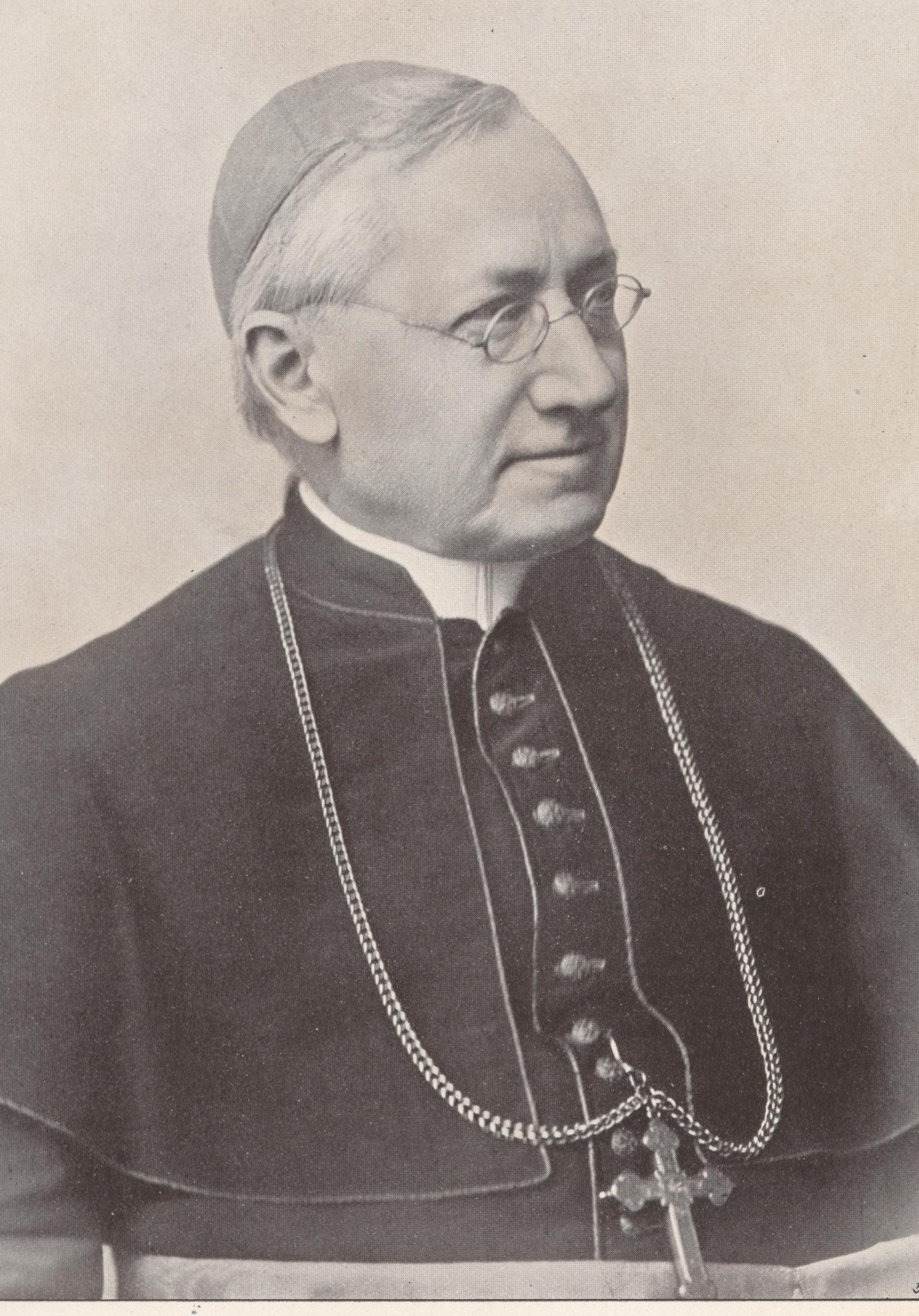
- Church: Catholic Church
- Diocese: Diocese of Regensburg
- In office: 18 March 1858 – 16 October 1906
- Predecessor: Valentin Riedel
- Successor: Anton von Henle

Orders
- Ordination: 19 March 1842
- Consecration: 2 May 1858 by Flavio Chigi

Personal details
- Born: 13 July 1818 Bärnau, Kingdom of Bavaria, German Confederation
- Died: 16 August 1906 (aged 88) Regensburg, Kingdom of Bavaria, German Empire
- Coat of arms

Bishop Ignatius von Senestrey (born 13 July 1818, Bärnau, Bavaria, Germany - d. 16 August 1906, Regensburg, Germany) was Bishop of Regensburg, Germany from 1858 to 1906.

He was ordained a parish priest by Flavio Chigi on 19 March 1842, aged 23. in Regensburg, Germany. On 27 January 1858, aged 39, he was appointed Bishop of Regensburg and ordained a bishop two months later.

He died on 16 August 1906, aged 88, in Regensburg. He had been a priest for 64 years and a bishop for 48 years.

He wrote one work, Wie es zur Definition de päpstlichen Unfehlbarkeit kam: Tagebuch vom 1. Vatikan Konzil, on the definition of papal infallibility. It was published after his death.

== Sources ==
- Paul Mai (2010). "Senestrey, Ignatius". Neue Deutsche Biographie (in German). Vol. 24. Berlin: Duncker & Humblot. pp. 252–253. (full text online).
- Johannes Kreuzenbeck (2002). "Senestrey, Ignatius von". In Bautz, Traugott (ed.). Biographisch-Bibliographisches Kirchenlexikon (BBKL) (in German). Vol. 20. Nordhausen: Bautz. cols. 1328–1331. ISBN 3-88309-091-3.
