= Manfred Müller (bishop) =

German bishop (1926–2015)

- Bishop of Regensburg
- Church: Catholic Church
- Diocese: Diocese of Regensburg
- In office: 16 June 1982 – 15 January 2002
- Predecessor: Rudolf Graber
- Successor: Gerhard Ludwig Müller
- Previous posts: Titular Bishop of Iubaltiana (1972-1982); Auxiliary Bishop of Augsburg (1972-1982)

Orders
- Ordination: 24 June 1952
- Consecration: 25 March 1972 by Josef Stimpfle

Personal details
- Born: 15 November 1926 Augsburg, Free State of Bavaria, German Reich
- Died: 20 May 2015 (aged 88) Mallersdorf-Pfaffenberg, Bavaria, Germany

Manfred Müller (15 November 1926 – 20 May 2015) was a German Catholic bishop.

Born in Augsburg, Germany, Müller was ordained to the priesthood in 1952 and was appointed titular bishop of Iubaltiana and auxiliary bishop of the Roman Catholic Diocese of Augsburg in 1972. In 1982, he was appointed bishop of the Roman Catholic Diocese of Regensburg and retired in 2002. On 20 May 2015, he died in the Mallersdorf Abbey in Bavaria.
