= Rupert of Palatinate-Simmern (bishop of Regensburg) =

German nobleman and bishop

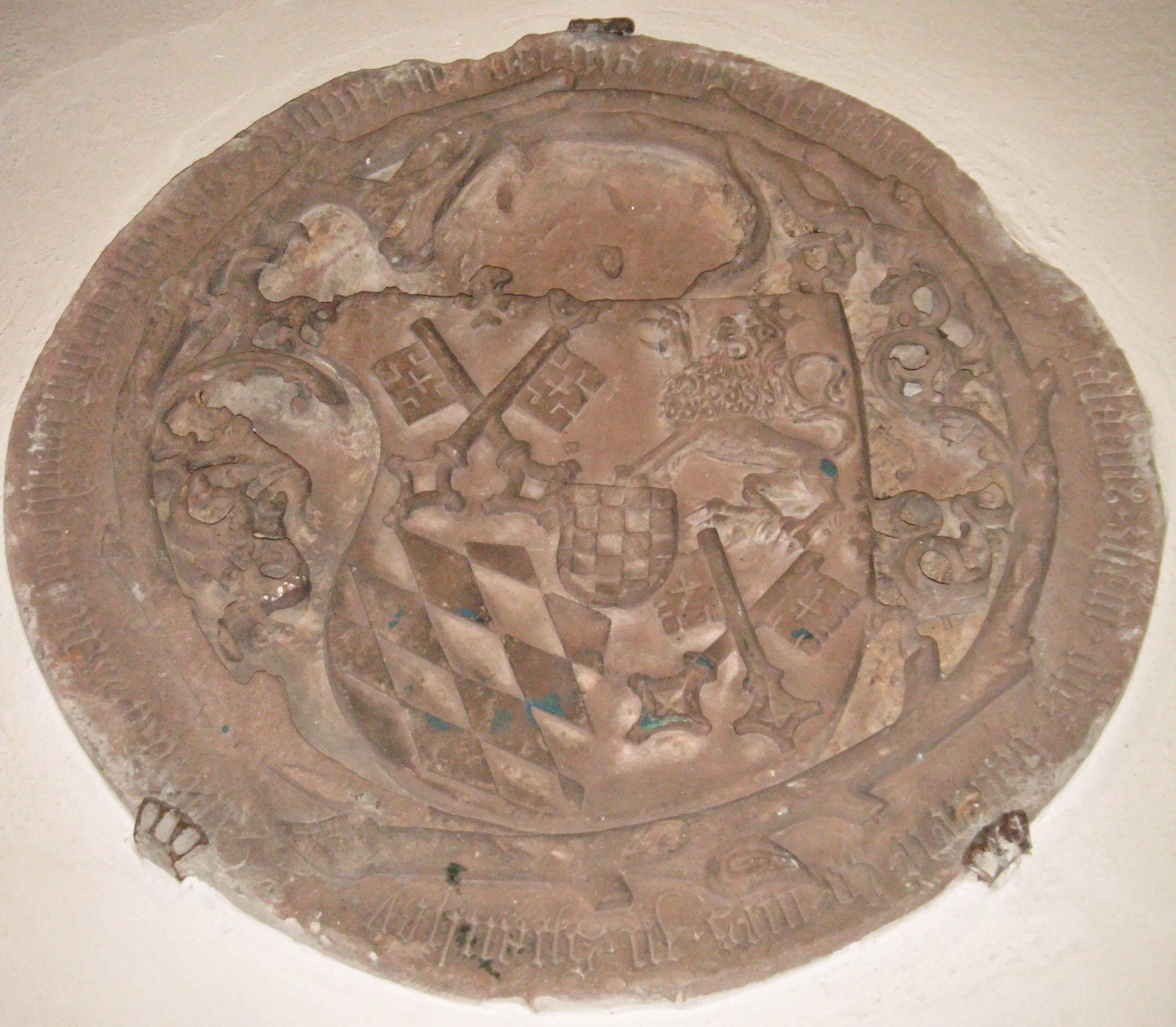
Keystone from the former cloister of Worms Cathedral (now in the Stadtmuseum Worms), commissioned by Rupert in 1494 and bearing his arms.

Rupert of Palatinate-Simmern (16 October 1461 – 19 April 1507) was a German nobleman and clergyman of the house of Palatinate-Simmern. From 1492 until his death he was the forty-fifth bishop of Regensburg as Rupert II (following Rupert of Palatinate-Mosbach as Rupert I).

== Life ==
He was the son of Frederick I, Count Palatine of Simmern and Margaret of Guelders. He and his brothers Stephen and Frederick matriculated in the juristic faculty of the 'Universitas Studii Coloniensis' (the old university of Cologne).

He suffered from a severe illness known as the Franzosenkrankheit or the French Disease, a term used at the time to refer to both syphilis and yaws – it prevented him from exercising his office, and eventually proved fatal. His bishopric was devastated by the War of the Succession of Landshut and its territories were altered by the creation of the dukedom of Palatinate-Neuburg. One of those to whom he delegated his authority was the inquisitor Heinrich Kramer, to compensate for the lower clergy's lack of energy in prosecuting witches and wizards in Abensberg.
