= Regensburg Cathedral =

Church in Germany

Saint Peter's Cathedral
- Regensburger Dom
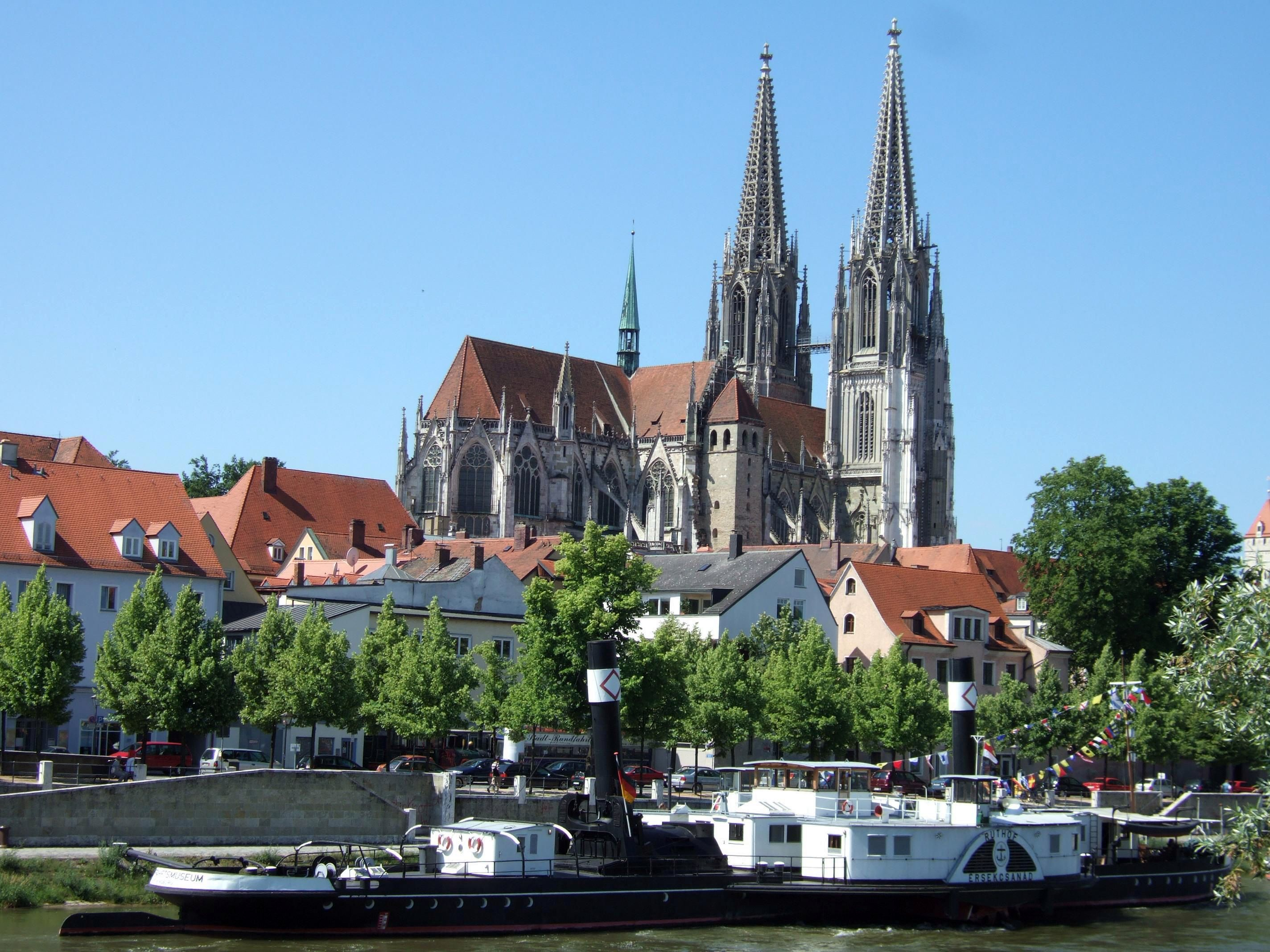
- Regensburg Cathedral, in the foreground the Danube.

- Location within Bavaria Location within Germany
- 49°01′10″N 12°05′54″E
- Location: Regensburg
- Country: Germany
- Denomination: Roman Catholic
- Website: Website

History
- Status: Active

Architecture
- Functional status: Cathedral
- Completed: 1520

Specifications
- Length: 85.40 m (280 ft 2 in)
- Width: 34.80 m (114 ft 2 in)
- Height: 31.85 m (104 ft 6 in)

Administration
- Diocese: Diocese of Regensburg

Clergy
- Bishop: Rudolf Voderholzer

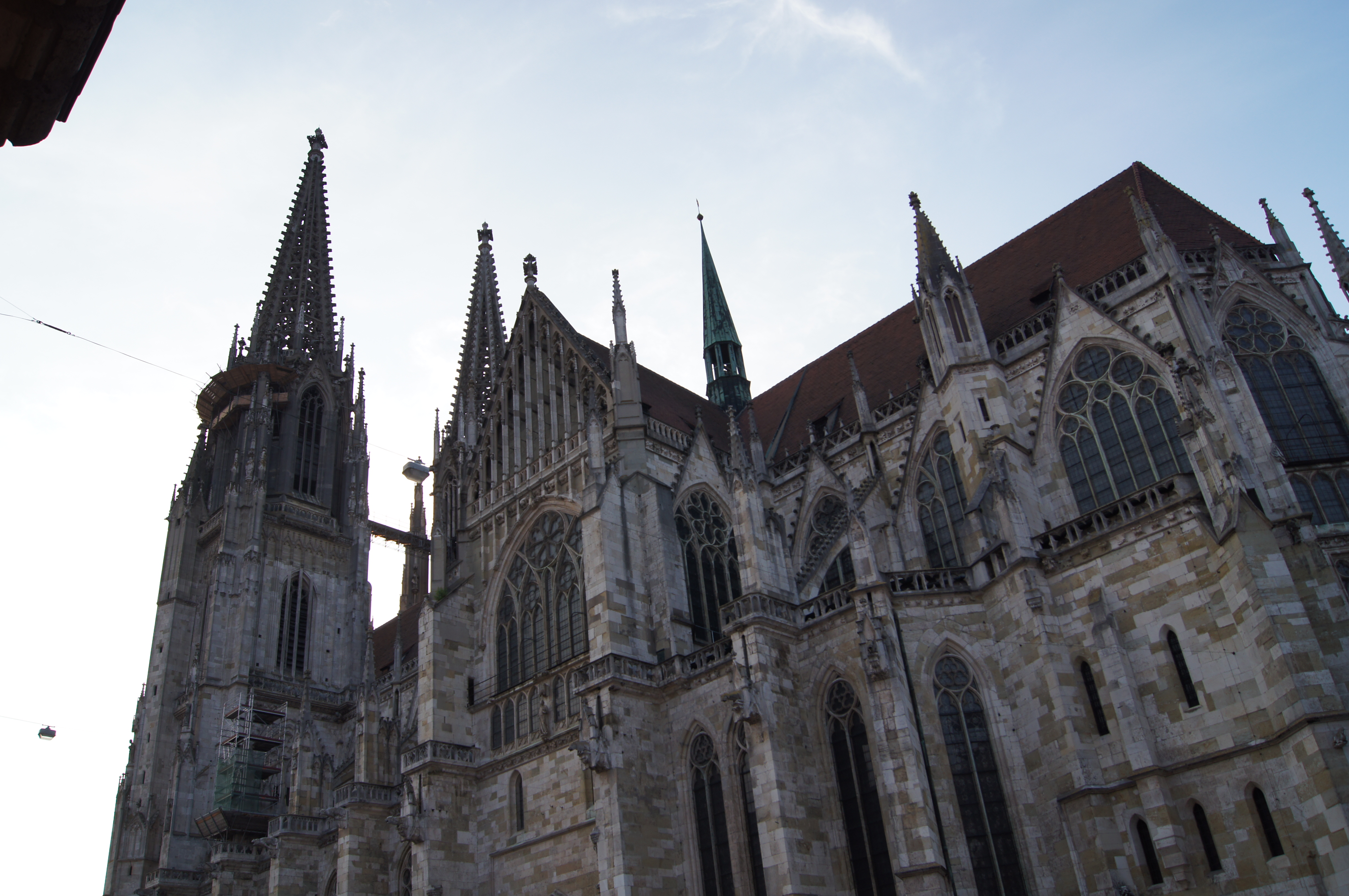
Regensburg exterior

Regensburg Cathedral (German: Dom St. Peter or Regensburger Dom), also known as St. Peter's Cathedral, is an example of important Gothic architecture within the German state of Bavaria. It is a landmark for the city of Regensburg, Germany, and the seat of the Catholic Diocese of Regensburg.

== History ==
The original church called Niedermünster, which was built west of where the current cathedral stands, was built around the year 700. Where it was positioned was some distance away from the Porta Praetoria which was a northern gate of Regensburg's old legionary fortress called Castra Regina. Although it was a tomb for Erhard of Regensburg, it was at first a chapel for a royal family (more specifically a ducal family). Niedermünster burned down in 1273, and because of the good economic status of Regensburg at the time a new cathedral was able to be constructed.

The architect that took over supervision over the new cathedral in 1280 was trained in France, and because of this there was an incorporation of French Gothic architectural themes. This included a central nave that divides into three sections, buttresses, vaulting, and two towers over a facade.

By 1320, the three choirs of this cathedral were ready for use, and between 1385 and 1415 the main entrance to the West was completed. Most of edifice was finished around the year 1520, and this was also the opening year for the cathedral.

One of the cathedral's builders, Mathes Roriczer, documented a way to determine architectural proportions from a ground plan. This technique, called ad quadratum or "of quadrature," depicts elevation on a ground plan using a series of polygons. From this technique he was able to develop the proportions of the cathedral's pinnacles.

In the 17th century, the cupola located at the transept’s crossing, along with other sectors of the cathedral, were renovated in a Baroque style. With this renovation, the frescoes that were created for the All Saints' Chapel were plastered over until being uncovered in the 19th century. Following this, between 1828 and 1841 the cathedral underwent a Neo-Gothic renovation, and this was commissioned by King Ludwig I of Bavaria. With this renovation the cupola was demolished and replaced with a quadripartite rib vault. Between 1859 and 1869, the towers as well as their spires were completed, and three years later the cathedral was fully complete.

The state-run Dombauhütte (cathedral building workshop) was founded in 1923, for the oversight, maintenance, and restoration of Regensburg Cathedral. One of the organization's restoration projects occurred during the 2000s. Another project the organization was involved in occurred in the 1980s, where the construction of the crypt mausoleum and archaeological exploration of the center nave were carried out.

== The building ==
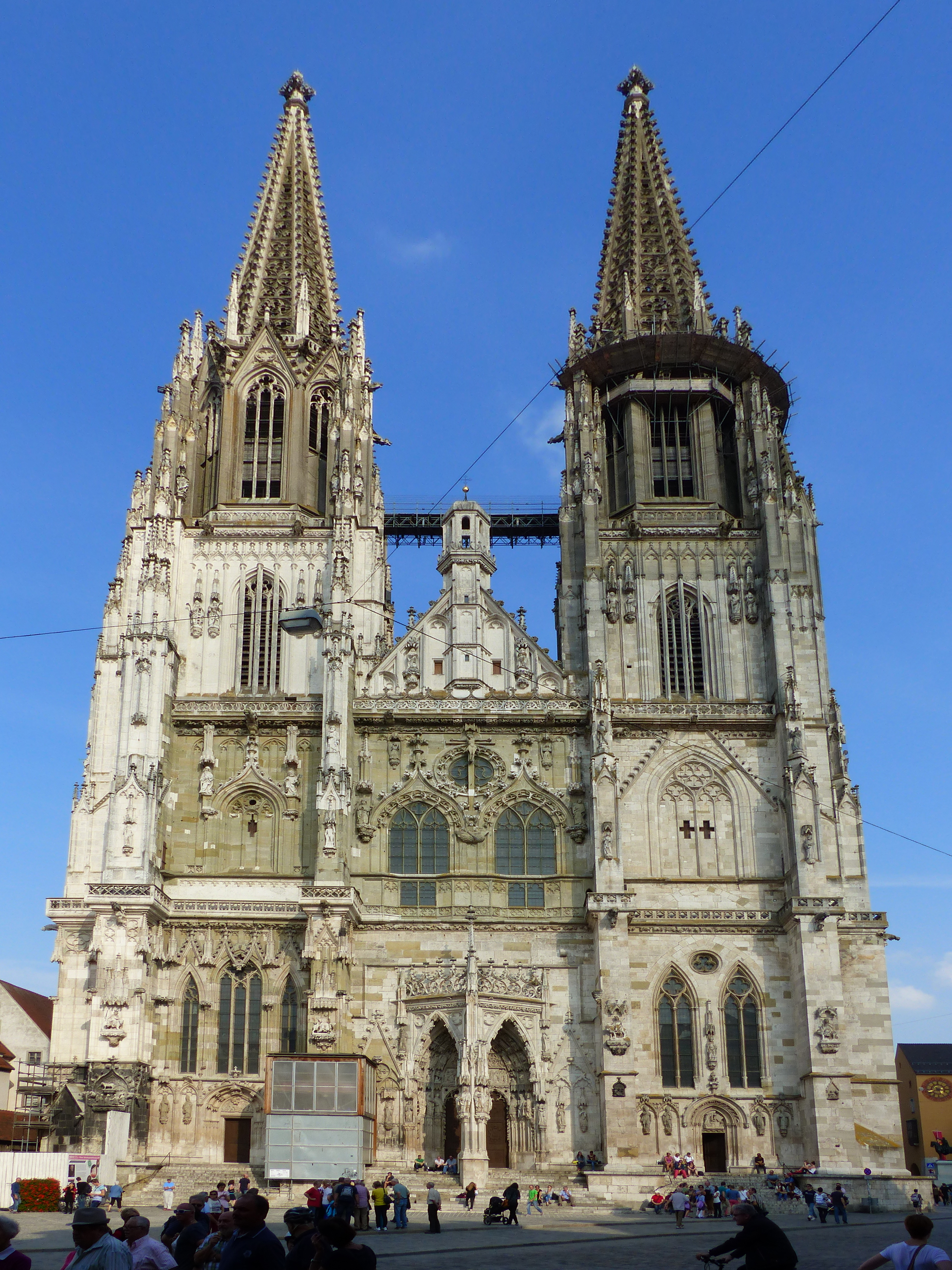
West façade

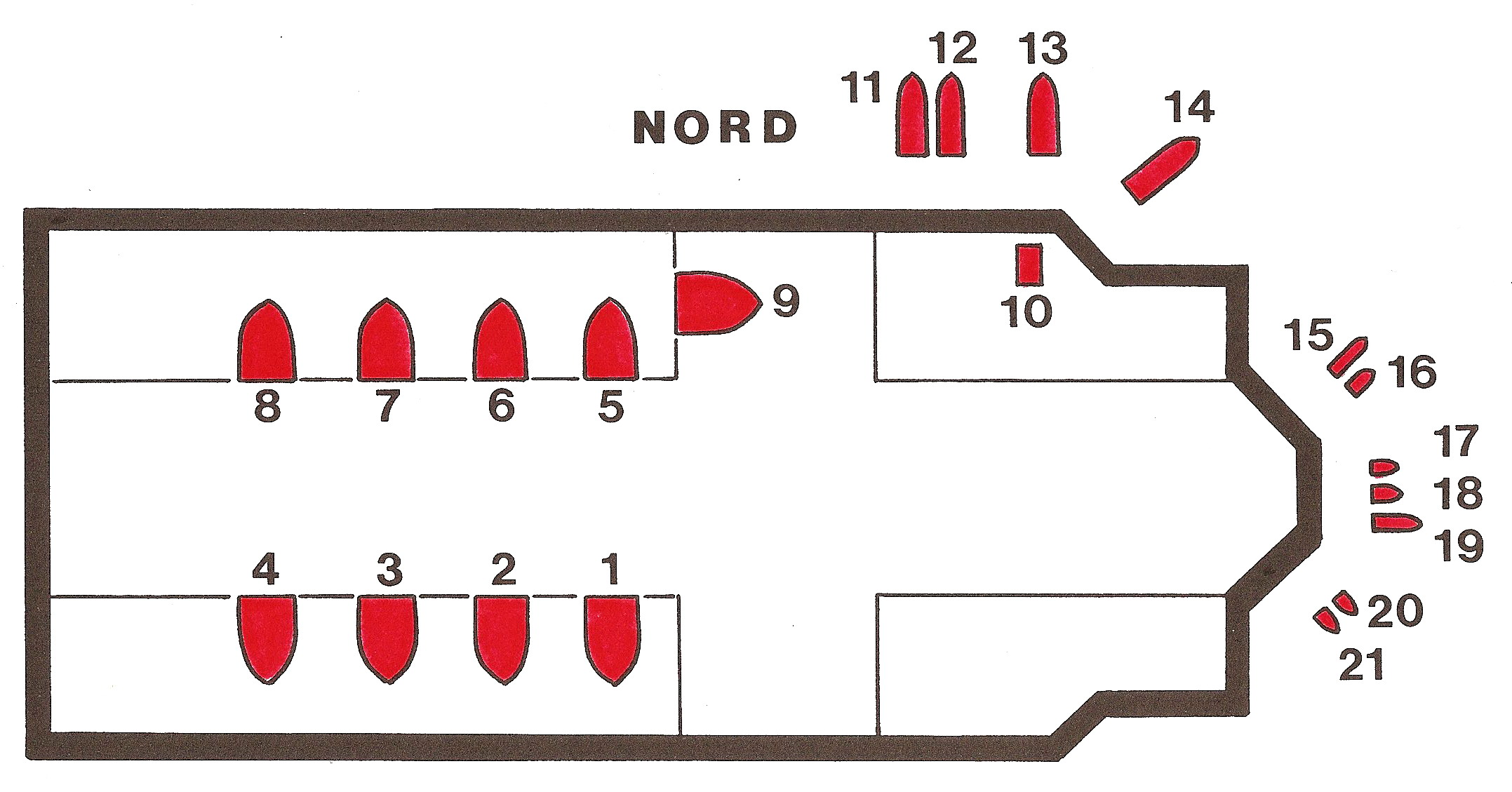
Groundplan of the stained glass windows by Josef Oberberger

An unusual feature of Regensburg Cathedral is its separation from the structure of the older cloister. This separation came about when the church was rebuilt and displaced to the southwest of the earlier Romanesque cathedral.

In testimony of that Romanesque precursor, the Eselsturm ("donkey tower") still stands on the north side of the cathedral; it was used in the past and is still used to transport construction materials to the upper levels. A pulley remains in the west loft, and with it materials were lifted through an opening in the ceiling near the west portal. To the east of the cathedral is the state-run Dombauhütte (cathedral building workshop) which is responsible for the preservation of the structure. In contrast with many cathedral building workshops, neither modern machines nor exclusively old tools are used. Rather, tools are manufactured in the workshop itself.

The Virgin and the Angel Annunciate are two notable, monumental sandstone statues located on two pillars of the west crossing piers. Additionally there was a statue of a seated figure representing St. Peter within the main choir, but it is not there today. These sandstone sculptures were created by a man under the title of Erminoldmeister, and during the 13th century he was a significant contributor to monumental sculptures in Germany. The two mentioned statues completed in 1280 that still exist within the cathedral today, one representing Mary, mother of Jesus, and the other representing the angel Gabriel, juxtapose one another on their pillars. Mary's right hand is slightly raised toward the angel in greeting. In her left hand she holds a book, into which she is pointing with her index finger.

In addition to these statues, on the eastern pillars at the crossing are stone figures of Saint Peter and Saint Paul, which were installed in 1320 and 1360–1370 respectively.

On the exterior there is a Judensau (Jews' sow) in the form of a sow and three Jews hanging on to its teats. The Judensau faces in the direction of the former Jewish quarter at the Neupfarrplatz. In 2005 there was a controversy about the posting of an informational sign.

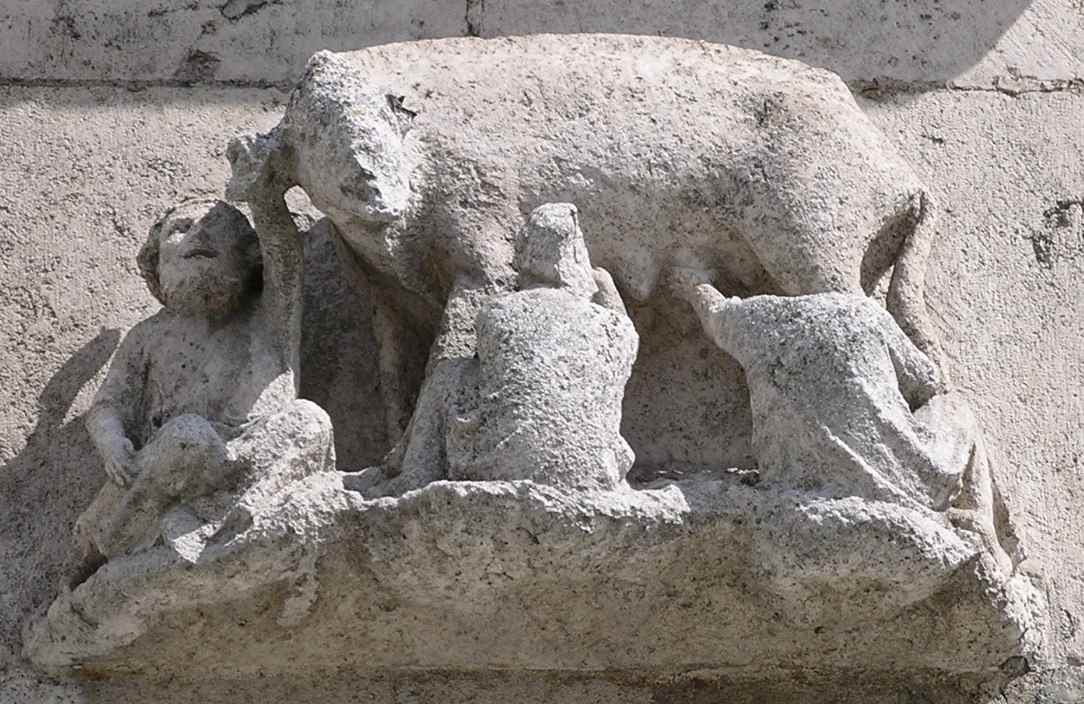
The Judensau (June 2004)

The All Saints' Chapel in the cathedral cloister was built in 1140 as a burial chapel for Bishop Hartwig II by a group of builders from Como in northern Italy. It consists of a trefoiled apse and a middle room with an octagonal drum and pavilon roof. Most of the valuable stained glass windows were installed between 1220–1230 and 1320–1370, and the windows of the west facade were only completed in the 19th century. Between 1967 and 1968, the windows of the left chancel, from the hand of the artist Professor Oberberger, were installed. He also produced the Pentecost window near the Northern transept and the clerestory windows in Gothic style.

The cathedral opened in the year 1550.

The silver high altar stems from Augsburg artists, and was built at some point between 1695 and 1785. Another particular feature are the five Gothic Altars of Reservation. In the southern choir a new Altar of Celebration was built in 2004, and it was the work of Helmut Langhammer.

== Significance ==
Regensburg Cathedral is the bishop's church and the principal church of the Roman Catholic Diocese of Regensburg. It is also the home of Regensburger Domspatzen, which serves as the cathedral choir, and is rich in tradition. The structure is considered the most significant Gothic work in southern Germany.

The cathedral is also the burial place of important bishops, including Johann Michael von Sailer (1829–1832, memorial built by Konrad Eberhard in the south chancel), Georg Michael Wittmann (1832–1833, memorial also by Konrad Eberhard in the north chancel), and Archbishop Michael Buchberger (1927–1961, likewise in the north chancel). In the western part of the central nave stands a bronze memorial for the Prince-Bishop Cardinal Philipp Wilhelm (d. 1598), the brother of Duke Maximilian I of Bavaria.

== Bells ==
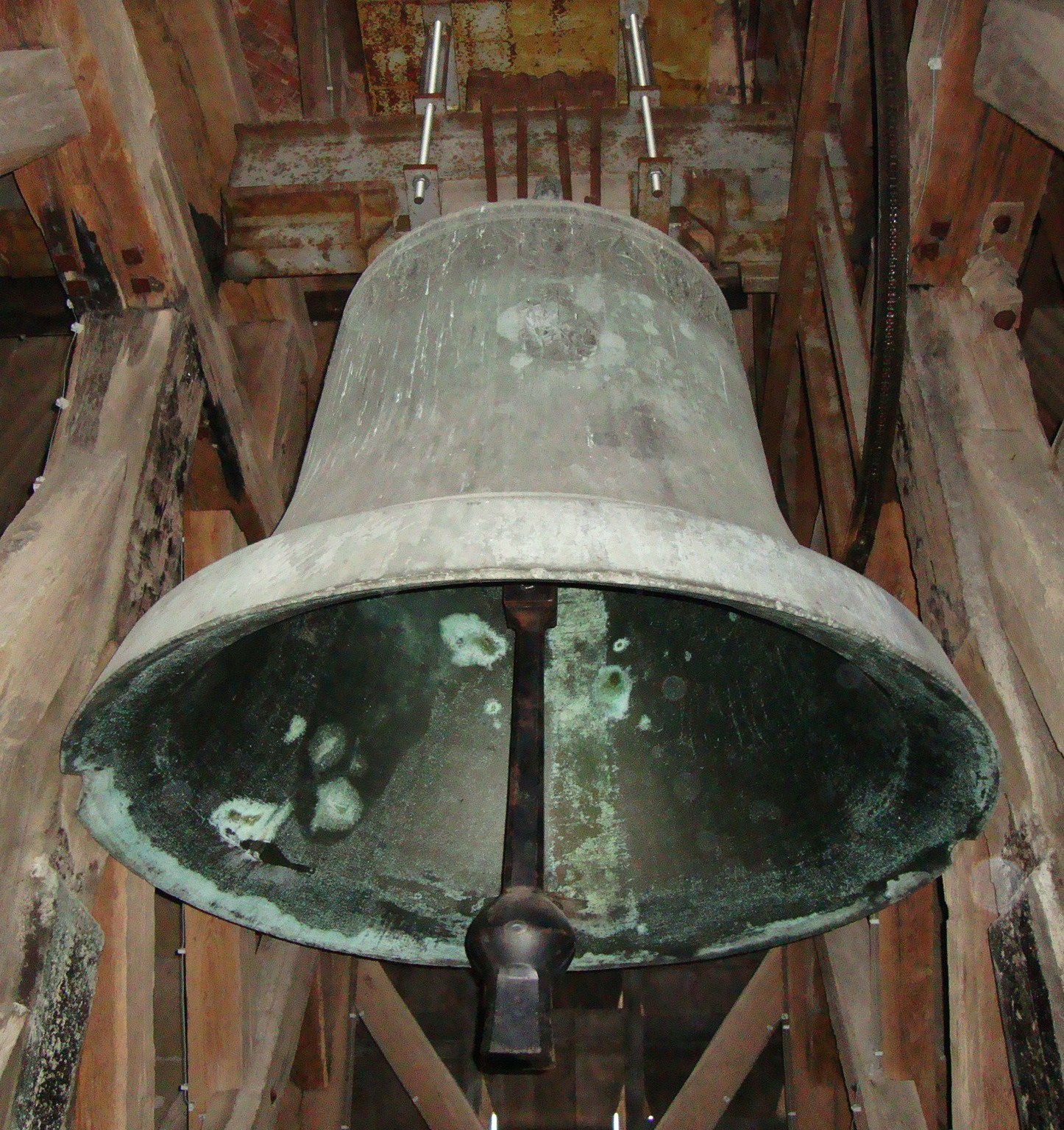
The Bourdon Bell of Regensburg Cathedral: The Great Princess

No.	Name (German)	Name (English)	Casting year	Mass (Kg)
1	Große Fürstin	Great Princess (Bourdon)	1696	4800
2	St.-Michaels-Glocke	St. Michael's Bell (2nd Bourdon)	1961	4500
3	Kleine Fürstin	Little Princess	1616	3250
4	Angelusglocke	Angelus bell	1961	1550
5	Agnus-Dei-Glocke	Agnus Dei bell	1965	1151
6	Armeseelenglocke	Poor souls bell	1961	626

The cathedral's peal consists of a total of six bells and is among the deepest-pitched in Bavaria, two of which are bourdon bells. The largest or bourdon bell is named the Great Princess. The bourdon alongside Bells 3 and 4 are hunged in the North Tower while the 2nd Bourdon alongside Bell a 5 and 6 are hunged in the South Tower. In Germany, the bells are always numbered from largest to smallest, Bell 1 is always the tenor or bourdon.

The individual bells are suspended differently: The three largest bells ring on straight steel yokes with an upper weight and counterweight clapper, bell 5 on a cranked steel yoke, and bells 4 and 6 on a straight steel yoke, the latter also having a counterweight clapper. All bell frames are made of wood.

== Dimensions ==
Overall length (interior)	85.40 m
Width (interior)	34.94 m
Height (nave)	31.85 m
Height (bell towers)	105 m

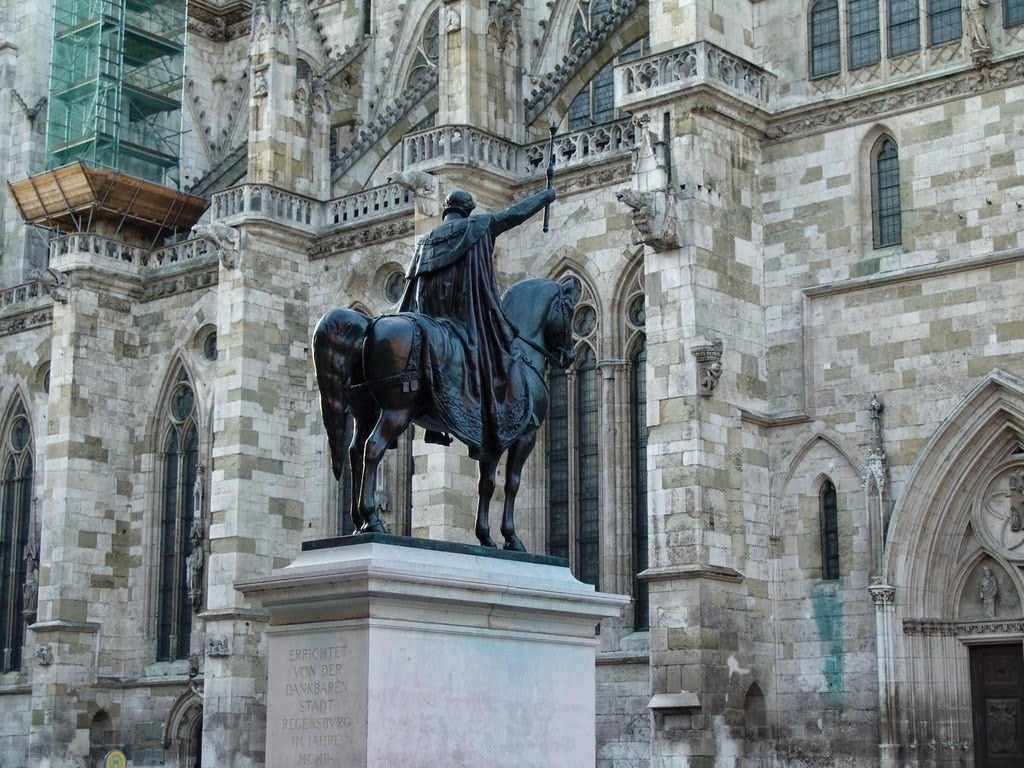
On the square at the cathedral in Regensburg

== Bibliography ==
- Peter Morsbach, Die Erbauer des Domes. Die Geschichte der Regensburger Dommeisterfamilie Roriczer-Engel (Regensburg: Schnell & Steiner 2009).
