= Michael Buchberger =

German priest and 74th bishop of Regensburg

His Excellency Michael Buchberger
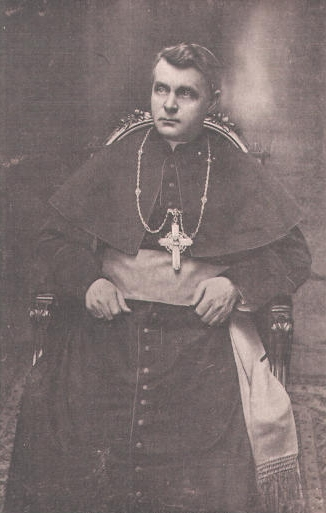
- Bishop Michael Buchberger (1928)
- Church: Roman Catholic Church
- Diocese: Regensburg
- Appointed: 12 March 1928
- Term ended: 10 June 1961
- Predecessor: Anton von Henle
- Successor: Rudolf Graber
- Other post: Titular Archbishop (from 1950)

Orders
- Ordination: 29 June 1900
- Consecration: 24 January 1924 by Michael von Faulhaber

Personal details
- Born: 8 June 1874 Jetzendorf, Bavaria, German Empire
- Died: 10 June 1961 (aged 87) Straubing, Bavaria, West Germany
- Denomination: Roman Catholic

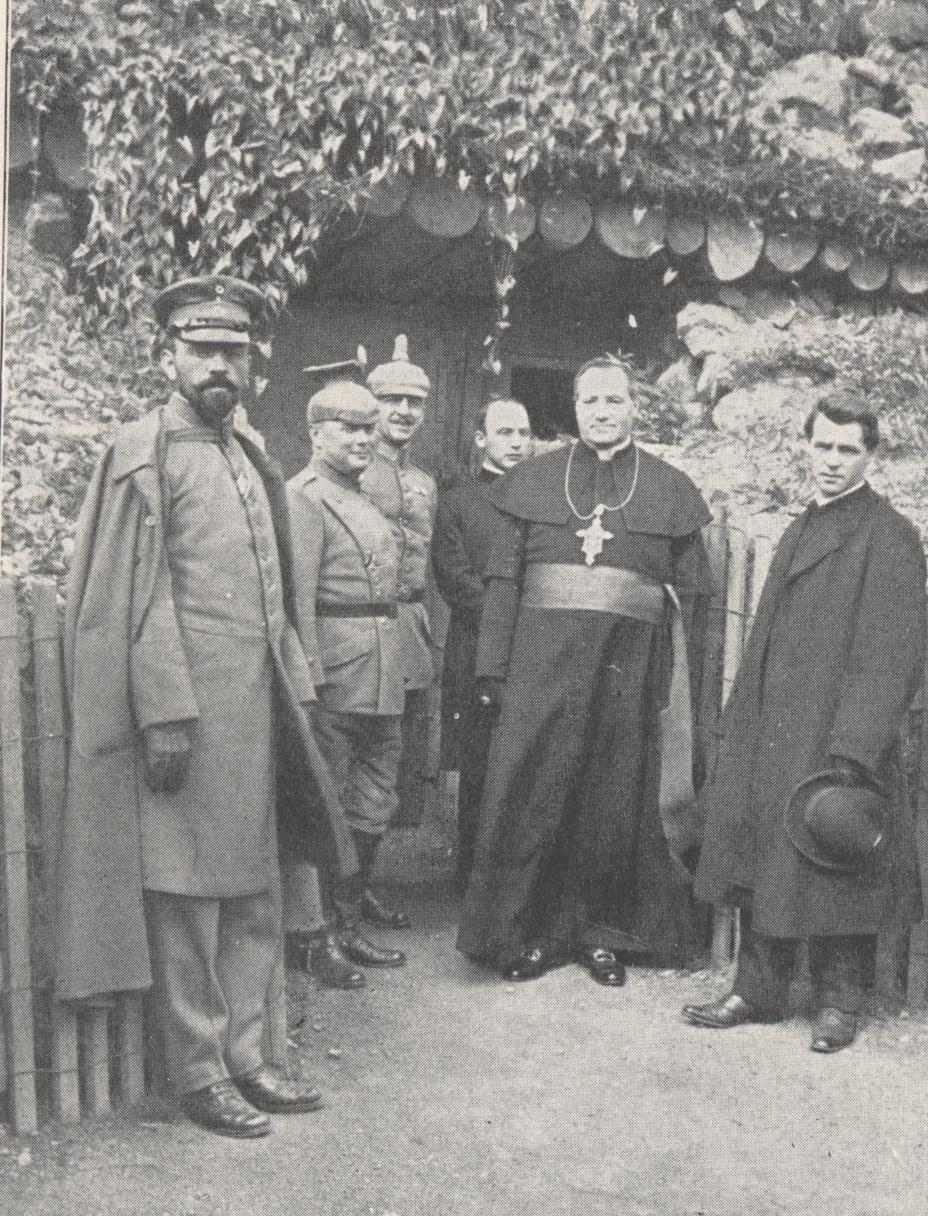
Buchberger (right) visiting Jakob Weis on the Western Front during the First World War

Michael Buchberger (8 June 1874, Jetzendorf – 10 June 1961, Straubing) was a Roman Catholic priest, notable as the seventy-fourth bishop of Regensburg since the diocese's foundation in 739.

== Life ==
Buchberger was ordained as a priest on 29 June 1900. In November 1923 Pope Pius XI promoted him to the rank of "Bishop" in the diocese Munich-Freising. On 24 January 1924 he was ordained as a bishop by Cardinal Faulhaber. From 12 March 1928 until his death, he was the Bishop of Regensburg.

He was an expert in church history and did work as an editor for several encyclopedic books on this subject, in which he also wrote articles himself. He was the editor of the Kirchliches Handlexikon (1904–1912), and between 1930 and 1938, he was the editor of the Lexikon für Theologie und Kirche, which in 10 volumes contained 8,000 articles.

In both publications, he showcases "Christian" antisemitism.

After the war, Buchberger was active in rebuilding the diocese. Immediately after the end of the war in 1945, 95 charitable institutions were founded by him.

In the following years, 175 new churches were built on his initiative. In 1950 on the occasion of the Christian Jubilee, Pope Pius XII made him an Archbishop.

Buchberger was an honorary member of a Catholic Corporation, Katholische Studentenverbindung Südmark (Akademischer Görresverein) in Munich, which is member of the Kartellverband katholischer deutscher Studentenvereine (KV).

== Awards ==
- 1950: personal rank of archbishop by Pius XII
- 1953: Großes Verdienstkreuz mit Stern und Schulterband of the German Federal Republic

== Bibliography ==
- Friedrich Wilhelm Bautz (1975). "Buchberger, Michael". In Bautz, Friedrich Wilhelm (ed.). Biographisch-Bibliographisches Kirchenlexikon (BBKL) (in German). Vol. 1. Hamm: Bautz. col. 786. ISBN 3-88309-013-1.
- Josef Staber: Kirchengeschichte des Bistums Regensburg. Regensburg 1966. S. 200–205.
