= Rupert of Palatinate-Mosbach =

German nobleman and clergyman

Rupert I
- Bishop-Elect of Regensburg
- Native name: Ruprecht von Pfalz-Mosbach
- Church: Catholic Church
- Diocese: Diocese of Regensburg
- In office: 4 September 1457 – 1 November 1465
- Predecessor: Frederick III of Plankenfels
- Successor: Henry IV of Absberg

Personal details
- Born: 1437
- Died: 1 November 1465 (aged 29–30) Ybbs, Archduchy of Austria, Holy Roman Empire

Rupert of Palatinate-Mosbach (1437 – 1 November 1465, Ybbs) was a German nobleman and clergyman. From 1457 to his death he was the forty-third bishop of Regensburg, as Rupert I.

== Family ==
He was descended from the house of Wittelsbach. His parents were Otto I, Count Palatine of Mosbach (son of Rupert, King of Germany and younger brother of Louis III) and his wife Joanna of Bavaria-Landshut (eldest daughter of Henry XVI, Duke of Bavaria). Rupert's brother Albert became bishop of Strasbourg, whilst his other brother John became a canon and went on pilgrimage to Jerusalem. Albert, Rupert and John were grandsons of Rupert, King of Germany.

== Life ==
He was recommended as bishop by Frederick III, Holy Roman Emperor, Ladislaus the Posthumous and Louis IX, Duke of Bavaria, leaving pope Callixtus III little option but to confirm the nomination. The original choice had been Henry of Asberg, but this failed and was declared invalid, though Henry later succeeded Rupert after his early death. Rupert defended the prince-bishopric from the Hussites and the robber barons. At a synod held by Rupert sinecure owners were reassigned, whilst he also ensured that sermons were better related to the text of the scriptures and acquired the castle at Barbing as an episcopal residence.

== Bibliography ==
- (in German) Michael Buchberger (ed.): 1200 Jahre Bistum Regensburg. Regensburg 1939, S. 43.
- (in German) Alois Schmid: Ruprecht. In: Neue Deutsche Biographie (NDB). Band 22, Duncker & Humblot, Berlin 2005, ISBN 3-428-11203-2, S. 291 (Digitalisat).
- (in German) Josef Staber: Kirchengeschichte des Bistums Regensburg. Regensburg 1966, S. 88–89.
