= Diocese of Regensburg =

Roman Catholic diocese in Germany

Coordinates: 49°01′10″N 12°05′53″E

Diocese of Regensburg Dioecesis Ratisbonensis Bistum Regensburg

Catholic
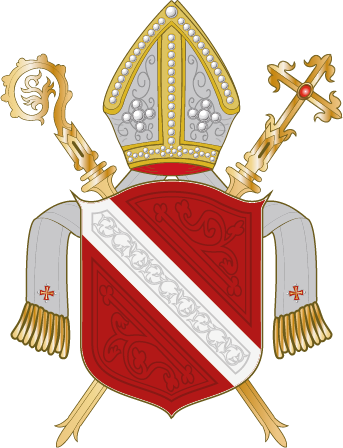
- Coat of arms

Location
- Country: Germany
- Ecclesiastical province: Munich and Freising

Statistics
- Area: 14,665 km^{2} (5,662 sq mi)
- Population: Total; Catholics: (as of 2014); 1,714,000; 1,200,209 (70%)

Information
- Denomination: Catholic
- Sui iuris church: Latin Church
- Rite: Roman Rite
- Established: 739
- Cathedral: Regensburg Cathedral
- Patron saint: St. Wolfgang of Ratisbon

Current leadership
- Pope: Leo XIV
- Bishop: Rudolf Voderholzer
- Metropolitan Archbishop: Reinhard Marx; Archbishop of Munich and Freising
- Auxiliary Bishops: Reinhard Pappenberger, Josef Graf
- Vicar General: Michael Fuchs

Map
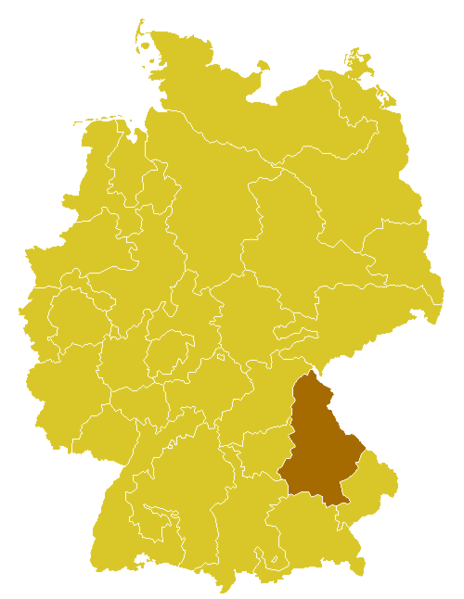

Website
- bistum-regensburg.de

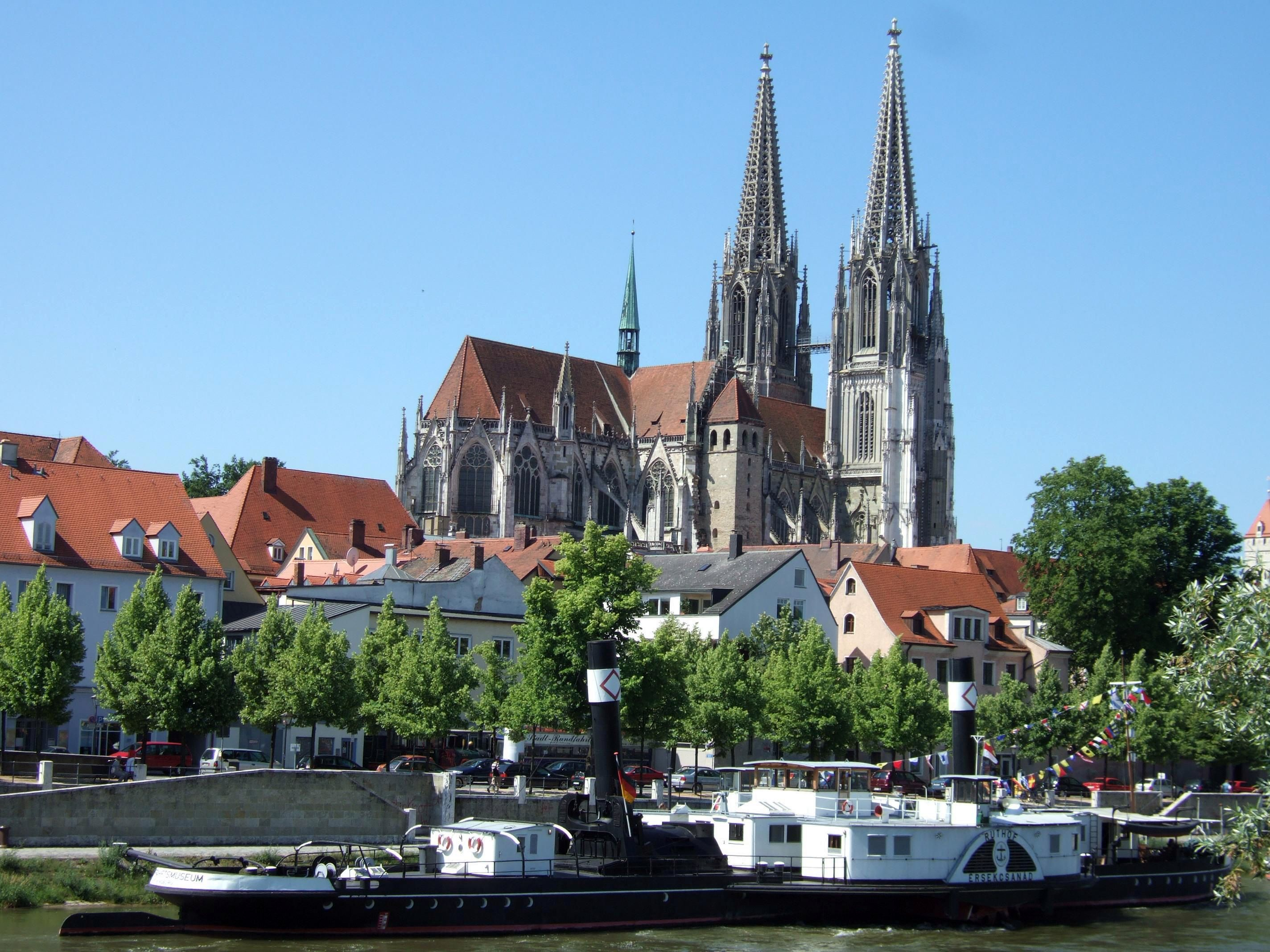
Regensburg Cathedral

The Diocese of Regensburg (Latin: Dioecesis Ratisbonensis; German: Bistum Regensburg) is a Latin Church diocese of the Catholic Church with its episcopal see based in Regensburg, Germany. Its district covers parts of northeastern Bavaria; it is subordinate to the archbishop of Munich and Freising. As of 2014, the diocese had 1.20 million Catholics, constituting 70% of its total population. The current bishop is Rudolf Voderholzer. The main diocesan church is Saint Peter in Regensburg. The diocese is divided into eight regions and 33 deaneries with 769 parishes. It covers an area of 14,665 km^{2}.

== History ==
The diocese was founded in 739 by Saint Boniface; it was originally subordinate to the archbishop of Salzburg. By the Reichsdeputationshauptschluss of 1803, the Bishopric was incorporated into the new Archbishopric of Regensburg.

== Ordinaries ==
- Friedrich von Parsberg † (24 May 1437 Appointed – Nov 1449 Died)
- Friedrich von Plankenfels † (23 Jan 1450 Appointed – 24 May 1457 Died)
- Ruprecht Pfalzgraf von Rhein † (2 Sep 1457 Appointed – 10 Oct 1465 Died)
- Heinrich von Absberg † (3 Nov 1465 Appointed – 26 Jul 1492 Died)
- Ruprecht Pfalzgraf bei Rhein † (26 Jul 1492 Succeeded – 19 Apr 1507 Died)
- Johann Pfalzgraf bei Rhein † (Apr 1509 Appointed – 3 Feb 1538 Died)
- Pankraz von Sinzenhofen † (25 Apr 1538 Appointed – 27 Jul 1548 Died)
- Georg Marschalk von Pappenheim † (8 Aug 1548 Appointed – 10 Dec 1563 Died)
- Veit von Fraunberg † (29 Dec 1563 Appointed – 21 Jan 1567 Died)
- David Kölderer von Burgstall † (6 Feb 1567 Appointed – 22 Jun 1579 Died)
- Philipp Wilhelm Herzog von Bayern † (Oct 1579 Appointed – 21 May 1598 Died)
- Sigmund Fugger von Kirchberg und Weißenhorn † (2 Jul 1598 Appointed – 5 Nov 1600 Died)
- Wolfgang von Hausen † (19 Dec 1600 Appointed – 3 Sep 1613 Died)
- Albert Reichsfreiherr von Törring † (22 Oct 1613 Appointed – 12 Apr 1649 Died)
- Franz Wilhelm Reichsgraf von Wartenberg † (12 Apr 1649 Succeeded – 1 Dec 1661 Died)
- Johann Georg Graf von Herberstein † (28 Feb 1662 Appointed – 12 Jun 1663 Died)
- Adam Lorenz Reichsgraf von Törring-Stein † (6 Aug 1663 Appointed – 16 Aug 1666 Died)
- Guidobald Reichsgraf von Thun † (7 Mar 1666 Appointed – 1 Jun 1668 Died)
- Albrecht Sigmund Herzog von Bayern † (30 Jul 1668 Appointed – 5 Nov 1685 Died)
- Joseph Clemens Kajetan Herzog von Bayern † (4 Nov 1685 Succeeded – 29 Sep 1694 Resigned)
- Clemens August Maria Herzog von Bayern † (26 Mar 1716 Appointed – 26 Apr 1719 Resigned)
- Johann Theodor Herzog von Bayern † (29 Jul 1719 Appointed – 27 Jan 1763 Died)
- Klemens Wenzeslaus Herzog von Sachsen † (27 Apr 1763 Appointed – 20 Aug 1768 Resigned)
- Anton Ignaz Reichsgraf von Fugger-Glött † (18 Jan 1769 Appointed – 15 Feb 1787 Died)
- Max Polykarp Reichsgraf von Törring-Jettenbach † (20 Apr 1787 Appointed – 30 Dec 1789 Died)
- Joseph Konrad Freiherr von Schroffenberg, C.R.S.A. † (30 Mar 1790 Appointed – 4 Apr 1803 Died)
- Karl Theodor Freiherr von Dalberg † (1 Feb 1805 Appointed – 10 Feb 1817 Died)
- Johann Nepomuk Freiherr von Wolf † (13 Sep 1821 Appointed – 23 Aug 1829 Died)
- Johann Michael Sailer † (23 Oct 1829 Succeeded – 29 May 1832 Died)
- Georg Michael Wittman † (25 Jul 1832 Appointed – 8 Mar 1833 Died)
- Franz Xaver von Schwäbl † (17 Mar 1833 Appointed – 12 Jul 1841 Died)
- Valentin von Riedel † (12 Sep 1841 Appointed – 6 Nov 1857 Died)
- Ignatius von Senestrey † (27 Jan 1858 Appointed – 16 Aug 1906 Died)
- Antonius von Henle † (18 Oct 1906 Appointed – 11 Oct 1927 Died)
- Michael Buchberger † (19 Dec 1927 Appointed – 10 Jun 1961 Died)
- Rudolf Graber † (28 Mar 1962 Appointed – 14 Sep 1981 Retired)
- Manfred Müller † (16 Jun 1982 Appointed – 15 Jan 2002 Retired, 20 May 2015 Died)
- Gerhard Ludwig Müller (1 Oct 2002 Appointed – 2 Jul 2012 Transferred); elevated to Cardinal in 2014
- Rudolf Voderholzer (6 Dec 2012 Appointed – present)

== Sexual abuse scandal ==
In July 2017, allegations surfaced that there was "a high degree of plausibility" that at least 547 members of the diocese's prestigious Domspatzen choir were either physically abused, sexually abused, or both between the years 1945 and 1992. Current bishop Rudolf Voderholzer had already announced plans to offer victims compensation of between 5,000 and 20,000 euros ($5,730 US and $22,930) each by the end of 2017. The report faulted Georg Ratzinger, the brother of Pope Benedict XVI and director of the choir between the years 1964 and 1994, for "in particular for 'looking away' or for failing to intervene." The report also stated that former Bishop Gerhard Ludwig Muller bears "clear responsibility for the strategic, organizational and communicative weaknesses" in the Diocese'

== See also ==
- Dominican Convent, Regensburg
