= Vitus Pichler =

Austrian Jesuit canonist and controversial writer

Vitus Pichler (born at Großberghofen, 24 May 1670; died at Munich, 15 February 1736) was an Austrian Jesuit canonist and controversial writer.

He studied for the secular priesthood, but after ordination entered the Society of Jesus, 28 September 1696. For four years he was professor of philosophy at Briggs and the University of Dillingen. He was then advanced to the chair of philosophy, controversial and scholastic, at the St. Salvator Jesuit College in Augsburg. He acquired fame in the field of canon law, which he taught for nineteen years at the University of Dillingen, and at the University of Ingolstadt, where he was the successor of Francis Xavier Schmalzgrueber. His last appointment was as prefect of higher studies at the Jesuit College in Munich.

== Works ==
Among Pichler's works were:

- Lutheranismus constanter errans (1709)
- Una et vera fides (1710)
- Theologia polemica particularis (1711)
- Papatus nunquan errans in proponendis fidei articulis (1709), on papal infallibility

In his Cursus theologiæ polemicæ universæ (1713), Pichler devotes the first part to the fundamentals of polemical theology and the second part to the particular errors of the reformers. It is said that he is the first writer to lay down, clearly and separately, the distinction between fundamental theology and other divisions of the science.

Pichler also wrote a number of works on canon law. These included:

- Candidatus juris prudentiæ sacræ (1722)
- Summa jurisprudentiæ sacræ universæ (1723)
- Manipulus casuum juridicorum
- several epitomes of his larger canonical treatises

Pichler's controversial works were in great vogue during the eighteenth century, while his books on canon law were used as textbooks in many universities. His solutions to difficult cases in jurisprudence gave a decided impetus to the study of the canons and afforded a key to the intricate portions of the Corpus juris canonici. Fourteen of Pichler's works, excluding the many editions and alterations, are enumerated.
