= Johann Christoph von Freyberg-Allmendingen =

Prince-Bishop of Augsburg from 1665 to 1690

- Prince-Bishop of Augsburg
- Diocese: Augsburg
- In office: 18 August 1665 – 1 April 1690
- Predecessor: Sigismund Francis, Archduke of Austria
- Successor: Alexander Sigismund von der Pfalz-Neuburg

Personal details
- Born: 28 September 1616 Altheim (Ehingen)
- Died: 1 April 1690 (aged 73) Dillingen an der Donau
- Buried: Augsburg Cathedral
- Denomination: Roman Catholic

Johann Christoph von Freyberg-Allmendingen (28 September 1616 – 1 April 1690) was the Prince-Provost of Ellwangen Abbey from 1660 to 1674, and the Prince-Bishop of Augsburg from 1665 to 1690.

== Biography ==
Johann Christoph von Freyberg-Allmendingen was born in Altheim (Ehingen) on 28 September 1616, the son of Kaspar von Freyberg zu Altheim und Worndorf and his wife Anna Regina von Rechberg. He was enrolled in the University of Dillingen at age 10, on 22 October 1626. He was made a canon of Augsburg Cathedral in 1630. He then began his studies at the University of Ingolstadt in 1635. He became a canon of Ellwangen Abbey in 1638. He became scholaster of Ellwangen Abbey in 1641, a post he would hold until 1655.

He was ordained as a priest in Augsburg on 5 April 1642. He became dean of Augsburg Cathedral in 1655, and its provost in 1660. On 11 May 1660 he became Prince-Provost of Ellwangen Abbey, a position he held until resigning on 13 April 1674. He became diocesan administrator of the Prince-Bishopric of Augsburg in 1661.

On 18 August 1665 he was selected as the new Prince-Bishop of Augsburg, with Pope Alexander VII confirming his appointment on 11 October 1666. Kaspar Zeiler, Auxiliary Bishop of Augsburg, consecrated him as a bishop on 17 April 1667.

He died in Dillingen an der Donau on 1 April 1690 and is buried in Augsburg Cathedral.

== Notes and references ==
Catholic Church titles
Preceded by Sigismund Francis, Archduke of Austria	Prince-Bishop of Augsburg; 1665 – 1690	Succeeded by Alexander Sigismund von der Pfalz-Neuburg
