= Christoph von Stadion =

Bishop of Augsburg from 1517 to 1543

- Prince-Bishop of Augsburg
- Diocese: Augsburg
- In office: 20 April 1517 – 15 April 1543
- Predecessor: Heinrich von Lichtenau
- Successor: Otto Truchsess von Waldburg

Personal details
- Born: Christoph von Stadion; Mid-March 1478 Schelklingen
- Died: 15 April 1543 Monastery of St. Egidien, Nuremberg
- Buried: Parish church in Dillingen an der Donau
- Denomination: Roman Catholic

Christoph von Stadion (Mid-March 1478 – 15 April 1543) was Prince-Bishop of Augsburg from 1517 to 1543.

== Biography ==
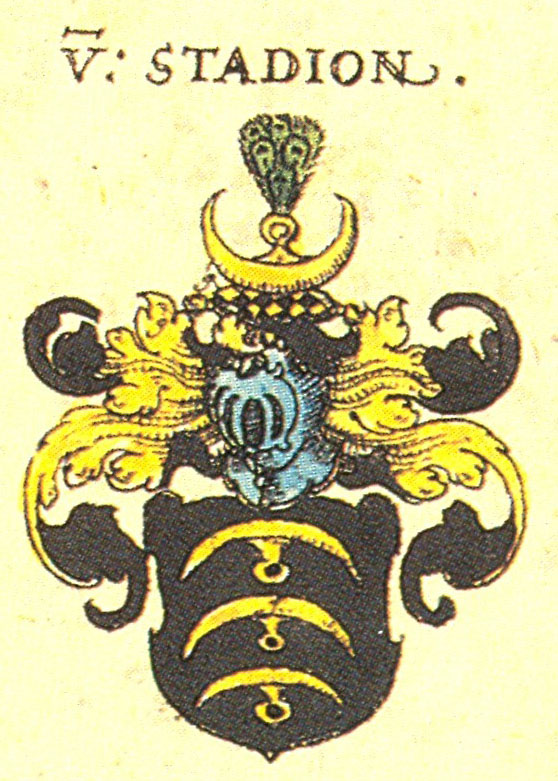
Coat of arms of the noble family of Stadion

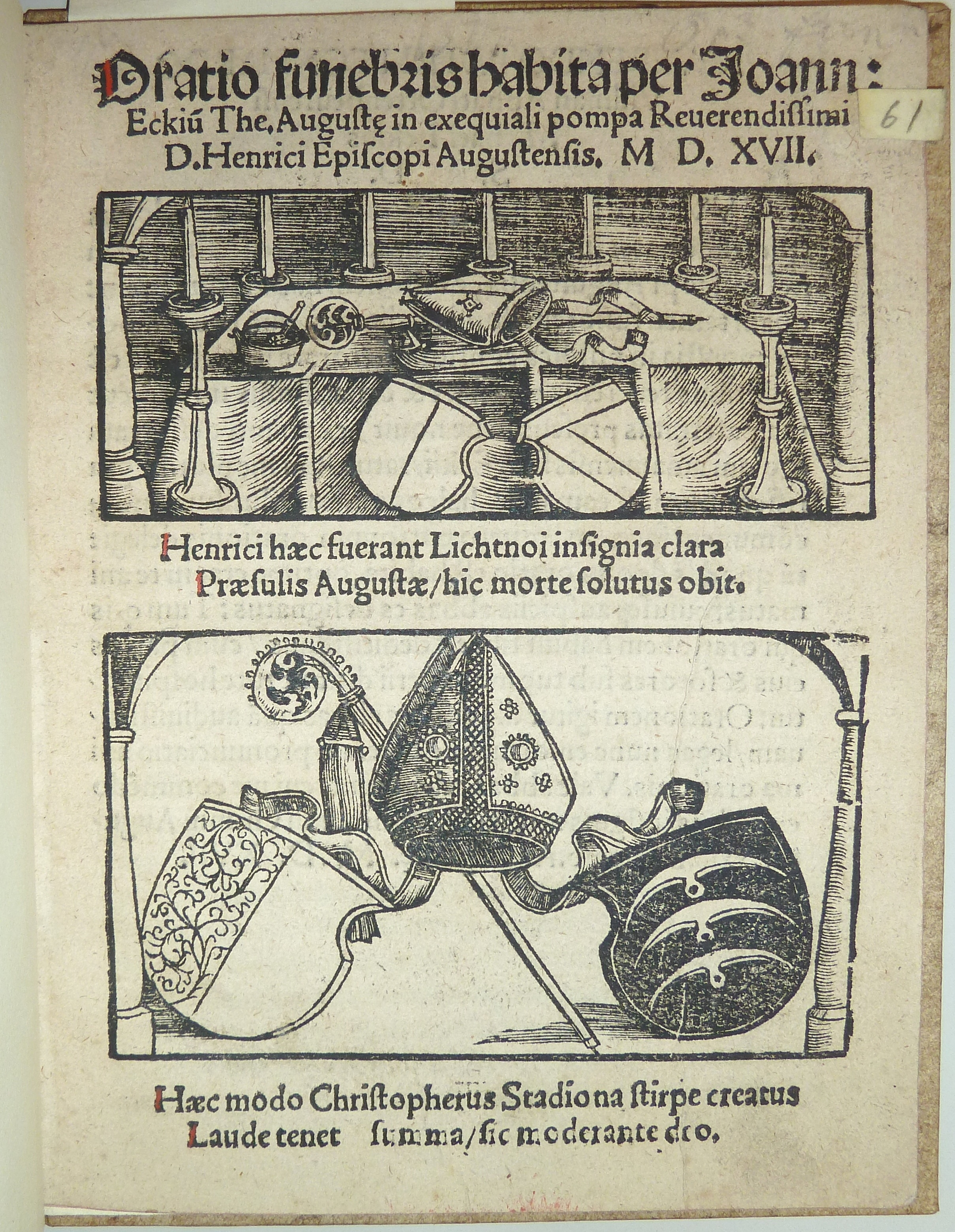
Wood engraving from 1517 with the coat of arms of both Augsburg bishops Heinrich von Lichtenau (1444-1517) and Christoph von Stadion (1478-1543). Each on the left side (in genealogical terms "right") Bisphopric Augsburg and on the right side (in genealogical terms "left") the paternal coat of arms.

Christoph von Stadion was born in Schelklingen in mid-March 1478, the son of Nikolaus von Stadion (d. 1507) and his wife Agatha von Gültlingen (d. 1504). In 1490, he began his studies at the University of Tübingen, receiving a bachelor's degree in 1491 and a master's in 1494. He then studied at the University of Freiburg, moving on to the University of Bologna in 1497. Finally, he studied at the University of Ferrara, from which he received a doctorate in law.

He became a canon in the cathedral chapter of Augsburg Cathedral in September 1506. In 1515, he was elected dean of the cathedral chapter. He was ordained as a priest in 1515.

In March 1517, shortly before the death of Heinrich von Lichtenau, Prince-Bishop of Augsburg, the cathedral chapter elected him coadjutor bishop, a selection confirmed by Pope Leo X on 20 April 1517, shortly after the death of Heinrich von Lichtenau. Christoph von Stadion was consecrated as a bishop by Gabriel von Eyb, Bishop of Eichstätt, on 5 July 1517.

He held a canonical visitation in the bishopric of Augsburg in 1518 and 1523. In the wake of the papal bull Exsurge Domine (1520), he moved to suppress the Reformation in the bishopric, particularly after 1522. He was unable, however, to halt the spread of Protestant ideas in Augsburg. As a result, he sought to chart a middle course with the Reformers, supporting moderation at the 1530 Diet of Augsburg. He was unable to prevent the expulsion of the Catholic clergy from the city of Augsburg in 1537.

He died in the Monastery of St. Egidien in Nuremberg on 15 April 1543, and was buried in the parish church in Dillingen an der Donau.

== Selected works ==
- 1517: Statuta diocesana Reverendissimi in christo patris et domini domini Christophori Episcopi Augustensis in celebratione Sinodi feria tercia post Galli Anno domini Millesimi quingentesimi decimiseptimi publicata, Auguste 1517 (Complete text PDF http://daten.digitale-sammlungen.de/~db/bsb00001964/image_1 With coat of arms of the bishop on image 3 - Bishopric Augsburg und family of Stadion).
- 1518: Synodalrede, (Complete text PDF http://www.mdz-nbn-resolving.de/urn/resolver.pl?urn=urn:nbn:de:bvb:12-bsb10366045-1).
- 1537: Warhaffte verantwurtung (...), (Complete text PDF http://daten.digitale-sammlungen.de/~db/0002/bsb00025024/image_1).

== Bibliography ==
- Freyberg-Eisenberg, Max Freiherr von (1884): Genealogische Geschichte des Geschlechtes der Freiherrn von Freyberg, nach urkundlichen Quellen zusammengestellt von Max Freiherrn von Freyberg-Eisenberg, Extended and improved ed. by Franz Rothenbacher, Mannheim, Selbstverlag, 2011.
- Hermelink, Heinrich (1906), Die Matrikeln der Universität Tübingen, vol. 1, Die Matrikeln von 1477–1600, Stuttgart, Kohlhammer Verlag (immatriculation note 49 of 22 April 1490, "Cristoferus de Stadion", later "Chr. Stadion de Schelklingen").
- Manfred Hörner (1995). "Stadion, Christoph von". In Bautz, Traugott (ed.). Biographisch-Bibliographisches Kirchenlexikon (BBKL) (in German). Vol. 10. Herzberg: Bautz. cols. 1087–1090. ISBN 3-88309-062-X.
- Jesse, Horst (1980), Christoph von Stadion, Bischof zu Augsburg während der Reformationszeit 1517–1544, Zeitschrift für bayerische Kirchengeschichte, vol. 49, pp. 86–122.
- Schlechter, Armin (2010), Neue Beiträge zur südwestdeutschen Buch- und Bibliotheksgeschichte um 1500, Zeitschrift für Württembergische Landesgeschichte, vol. 69, pp. 195–221.
- Schübelin, Eugen (1906), Zwei berühmte Schelklinger, Blätter des Schwäbischen Albvereins, vol. 18, cols. 173–180 (about Christoph von Stadion and Konrad von Bemelberg).
- Schwarzmaier, Hansmartin, Jörg Martin, and Wilfried Schöntag (eds.) (2007), Aus dem Archiv der Grafen von Stadion - Urkunden und Amtsbücher des Gräflich von Schönborn'schen Archivs Oberstadion, Konstanz and Eggingen, Edition Isele (=Documenta Suevica, vol. 14).
- Schwennicke, Detlev (ed.) (1981), Europäische Stammtafeln, New Series vol. IV, Standesherrliche Häuser I, Marburg, J. A. Stargardt, tables 156–160 (Die (Grafen von) Stadion).
- Stiefenhofer, Dominikus (1880), Chronik der gräflichen Familie von Stadion, Oberstadion: typoscript, pp. 42ff.
- Zapf, Georg Wilhelm (1799), Christoph von Stadion, Bischof von Augsburg - Eine Geschichte aus den Zeiten der Reformation, Zürich, Orell, Füßli (Complete text PDF http://www.mdz-nbn-resolving.de/urn/resolver.pl?urn=urn:nbn:de:bvb:12-bsb10310009-1)
- Zoepfl, Friedrich (1959), Bischof Christoph von Stadion (1478–1543), Götz Freiherr von Pölnitz (ed.), Lebensbilder aus dem Bayerischen Schwaben, vol. 7, pp. 125–160, Munich, Max Hueber.
- Zoepfl, Friedrich (1969), Das Bistum Augsburg und seine Bischöfe im Reformationsjahrhundert, Munich, Schnell & Steiner; Augsburg, Winfried-Werk, pp. 1–172 (=Geschichte des Bistums Augsburg und seiner Bischöfe, vol. II).

Catholic Church titles
Preceded by Heinrich von Lichtenau	Prince-Bishop of Augsburg; 1517 – 1543	Succeeded by Otto Truchsess von Waldburg
