= Johann Otto von Gemmingen =

Bishop of Augsburg from 1591 to 1598

- Prince-Bishop of Augsburg
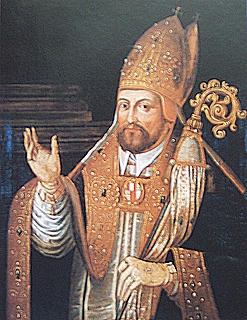
- Johann Otto von Gemmingen
- Church: Roman Catholic
- Diocese: Augsburg
- In office: 21 March 1591 – 6 October 1598
- Predecessor: Marquard von Berg
- Successor: Heinrich von Knöringen

Personal details
- Born: 23 October 1545; Tiefenbronn
- Died: 6 October 1598 (aged 52); Dillingen an der Donau

Johann Otto von Gemmingen (23 October 1545 – 6 October 1598) was the Prince-Bishop of Augsburg from 1591 to 1598.

== Biography ==
Johann Otto von Gemmingen was born in Tiefenbronn on 23 October 1545, the fourth child of Hans Dietrich von Gemmingen and his wife Magdalena. He probably spent his early years in the Weinfelden Castle, before his father sold it to the Fugger family in 1555. He studied in Italy before enrolling in the University of Ingolstadt in 1565.

He became a canon of Augsburg Cathedral in 1565 and of Eichstätt Cathedral in 1568. He became the dean of Augsburg Cathedral in 1580 and was ordained as a priest in 1581. The cathedral chapter of Eichstätt Cathedral elected him as Bishop of Eichstätt in 1590 but declined because he wanted to stay in Augsburg. His nephew, Johann Konrad von Gemmingen, was subsequently elected as Bishop of Eichstätt.

The cathedral chapter of Augsburg Cathedral elected him Prince-Bishop of Augsburg on 21 March 1591. Pope Gregory XIV confirmed his appointment on 10 May 1591, and he was consecrated as a bishop on 25 August 1591. As bishop, Johann Otto promoted Roman Catholicism and introduced many reforms. He promoted the use of the catechism of Petrus Canisius in the Bishopric of Augsburg. He also established many charitable works.

Johann Otto von Gemmingen died in Dillingen an der Donau on 6 October 1598.

== Notes and references ==
=== Attribution ===
- This page is based on this page on German Wikipedia.

Catholic Church titles
Preceded by Marquard von Berg	Prince-Bishop of Augsburg; 1591 – 1598	Succeeded by Heinrich von Knöringen
