= Bishopric of Augsburg =

Bishopric of Augsburg may refer to:

- Roman Catholic Diocese of Augsburg, spiritual jurisdiction of the bishop of Augsburg
- Prince-Bishopric of Augsburg, secular jurisdiction of the bishop as a prince of the Holy Roman Empire between about 888 and 1803
