= Muggia castle =

14th-century castle in Muggia, Italy

Muggia Castle
- Castello di Muggia
- Muggia, Friuli-Venezia Giulia, Italy
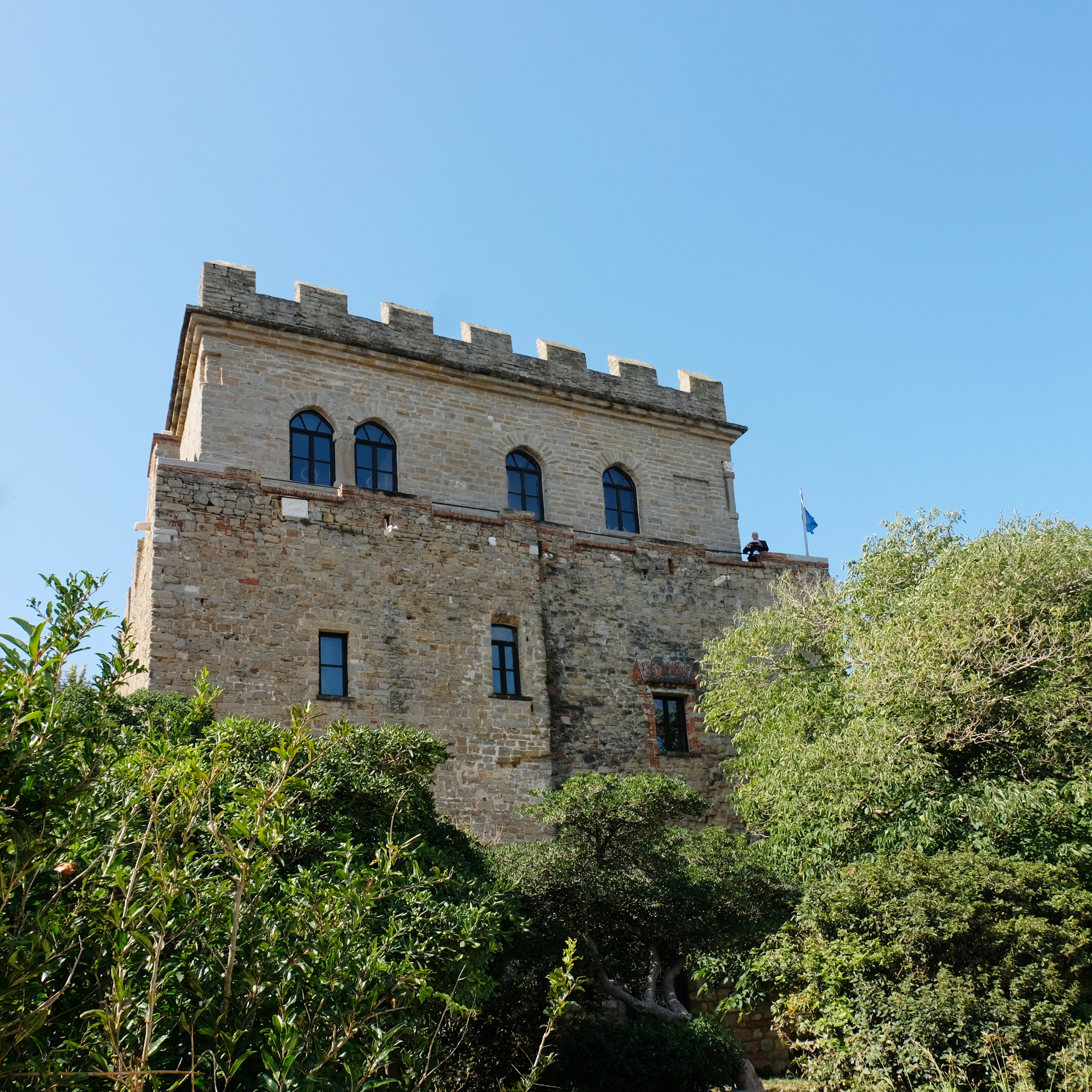
- Muggia Castle in 2020

Site information
- Type: Castle
- Open to the public: Yes
- Condition: Restored
- Website: www.castellodimuggia.it

Location
- Coordinates: 45.6048°N 13.7659°E

Site history
- Built: 1374–late 14th century
- Built by: Marquard of Randeck
- Materials: Sandstone

Muggia Castle is a late-medieval fortress in Muggia, in the Italian region of Friuli-Venezia Giulia. It stands above the Mandracchio, Muggia's inner harbour, and the town's historic centre.

== History ==
The present castle was built at Borgolauro, the medieval settlement that developed around Muggia's harbour. Construction began in 1374 on the orders of Marquard of Randeck, the patriarch of Aquileia, after a pro-Venetian faction led by Raffaele di Ser Steno seized the town. Work continued through the end of the 14th century. Muggia and its castle came under the rule of the Republic of Venice in 1420. The castle retained a military role until about 1700 and was subsequently abandoned into the 20th century.

In 1991, sculptor Villi Bossi and his wife, Gabriella Fiorencis, bought the deteriorated castle. They spent more than 13 years restoring it as a residence and studio, and it was opened on occasion for cultural events.

Bossi and Fiorencis sold the castle on 10 December 2025 to Culture Arti e Saperi Srl for €3.3 million. The new owners first opened it to visitors on 28 and 29 March 2026 as part of the regional Castelli Aperti programme, and announced plans to use it for exhibitions, concerts and other events.

== Architecture ==
The castle is built of squared sandstone blocks. It originally had two towers. Its exterior wall circuit retains the main entrance, a gate used by military patrols and several arrow slits.
