= Marquard von Berg =

Prince-Bishop of Augsburg from 1575 to 1591

- Prince-Bishop of Augsburg
- Diocese: Augsburg
- In office: 26 July 1575 – 29 January 1591
- Predecessor: Johann Eglof von Knöringen
- Successor: Johann Otto von Gemmingen

Personal details
- Born: Marquard von Berg; 1528 Öpfingen
- Died: 29 January 1591 (aged 62–63) Dillingen an der Donau
- Denomination: Roman Catholic

Marquard von Berg (1528 – 29 January 1591) was Prince-Bishop of Augsburg from 1575 to 1591.

== Biography ==
Marquard von Berg was born in Öpfingen in 1528. At the age of 13, he was sent to study at the University of Ingolstadt, where he remained until 1545. Starting in 1548, he studied law at the University of Padua and the University of Pavia. In 1551, he interrupted his studies to take over the parish church in Langweid am Lech. He then completed his studies, graduating in 1554. In 1559 he became provost of Bamberg Cathedral.

He was elected Prince-Bishop of Augsburg on 26 July 1575 and Pope Gregory XIII confirmed his appointment on 24 September 1575. He was ordained as a priest on 8 December 1575. Michael Dornvogel, auxiliary bishop of Augsburg, consecrated him as a bishop on 15 January 1576.

He died in Dillingen an der Donau on 29 January 1591.

== Notes and references ==
Catholic Church titles
Preceded by Johann Eglof von Knöringen	Prince-Bishop of Augsburg; 1575 – 1591	Succeeded by Johann Otto von Gemmingen
