= Heinrich von Knöringen =

Prince-Bishop of Augsburg from 1599 to 1646

- Prince-Bishop of Augsburg
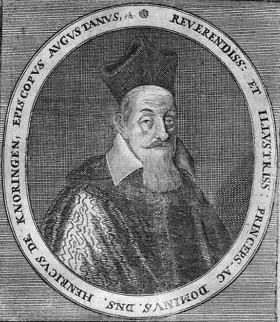
- Prince-Bishop of Augsburg Heinrich von Knöringen
- Diocese: Augsburg
- In office: 19 April 1599 – 25 June 1646
- Predecessor: Johann Otto von Gemmingen
- Successor: Sigismund Francis, Archduke of Austria

Personal details
- Born: 5 February 1570 Nesselwang
- Died: 25 June 1646 (aged 76) Dillingen an der Donau
- Denomination: Roman Catholic

Heinrich von Knöringen (5 February 1570 – 25 June 1646) was Prince-Bishop of Augsburg from 1599 to 1646.

== Biography ==
Heinrich von Knöringen was born in Nesselwang on 5 February 1570, the son of Johann Christoph von Knöringen. He took the minor orders in 1586 and three years later he began the study of law at the University of Ingolstadt. On 19 April 1599, the cathedral chapter of Augsburg Cathedral elected him to be Prince-Bishop of Augsburg. He was ordained as a priest in May 1599. On 13 June 1599, Johann Konrad von Gemmingen, Bishop of Eichstätt, consecrated him as a bishop.

His time as Bishop of Augsburg largely overlapped with the Thirty Years' War (1618–1648). He supported the decision of Ferdinand II, Holy Roman Emperor to issue the Edict of Restitution in 1629. See Ward, ed., Cambridge Modern History: Vol. 4 Thirty Years' War 1907, p. 110. From 1632 to 1635 and in 1645 the Thirty Years' War forced him to flee the Prince-Bishopric of Augsburg; he took refuge in Reutte, Hall in Tirol, and Innsbruck at various times.

== Notes and references ==
Catholic Church titles
Preceded by Johann Otto von Gemmingen	Prince-Bishop of Augsburg; 1599 – 1646	Succeeded by Sigismund Francis, Archduke of Austria
