= Johann Eglof von Knöringen =

Bishop of Augsburg from 1573 to 1575

- Prince-Bishop of Augsburg
- Diocese: Augsburg
- In office: 18 May 1573 – 4 June 1575
- Predecessor: Otto Truchsess von Waldburg
- Successor: Marquard von Berg

Personal details
- Born: Johann Eglof von Knöringen; 25 July 1537 Kreßberg
- Died: 4 June 1575 (aged 37) Dillingen an der Donau
- Denomination: Roman Catholic

Johann Eglof von Knöringen (25 July 1537 – 4 June 1575) was Prince-Bishop of Augsburg from 1573 to 1575.

== Biography ==
Johann Eglof von Knöringen was born in Kreßberg on 25 July 1537. 1537 was the same year that the Catholic clergy were expelled from the city of Augsburg. When he was 13 years old, he was sent to the University of Ingolstadt. He later studied at the University of Freiburg, where he studied under Heinrich Glarean and Johann Hartung.

In 1553, he received rich benefices in Würzburg, Freising, and Augsburg. In the 1550s, he traveled widely in Rome, Vienna, northern Germany, and the Seventeen Provinces.

He was ordained as a priest in 1561. In 1571, Pope Pius V appointed him protonotary apostolic to deal with the dispute with the Jesuits that had led to violence in Augsburg.

He was elected as Prince-Bishop of Augsburg on 18 May 1573, and Pope Gregory XIII confirmed the appointment on 31 July 1573.

He died in Dillingen an der Donau on 4 June 1575 without ever having been consecrated as a bishop.

== Notes and references ==
Catholic Church titles
Preceded by Otto Truchsess von Waldburg	Prince-Bishop of Augsburg; 1573 – 1575	Succeeded by Marquard von Berg
