= Otto Truchsess von Waldburg =

Bishop of Augsburg from 1543 to 1573)

His Eminence Otto Truchsess von Waldburg
- Prince-Bishop of Augsburg
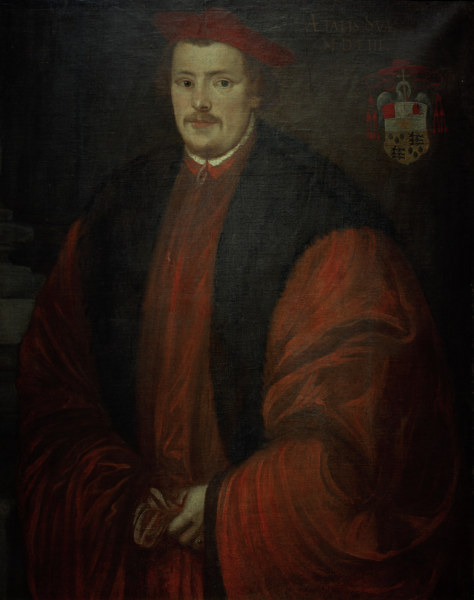
- Cardinal Otto Truchsess von Waldburg, contemporary portrait by Lambert Sustris
- Diocese: Augsburg
- In office: 10 May 1543 – 2 April 1573
- Predecessor: Christoph von Stadion
- Successor: Johann Eglof von Knöringen

Orders
- Created cardinal: 19 December 1544 by Pope Paul III

Personal details
- Born: Otto Truchsess von Waldburg; 25 February 1514 Scheer Castle
- Died: 2 April 1573 (aged 59) Rome, Papal States
- Denomination: Roman Catholic

Otto Truchsess von Waldburg (25 February 1514 – 2 April 1573) was Prince-Bishop of Augsburg from 1543 until his death and a Cardinal of the Catholic Church.

== Childhood and Education ==
Otto was born at Scheer Castle to the Swabian noble House of Waldburg, which, for their support in the German Peasants' War was vested with the title of a hereditary Imperial Seneschal (Truchsess) by Emperor Charles V in 1526. Designated for an ecclesiastical career, he studied at the Universities of Tübingen, Dole, Padua, Bologna, where he received his degree of Doctor of Theology in 1534, and Pavia. He was a fellow student of Cristoforo Madruzzo, Stanislaus Hosius and Viglius van Zwichem.

At an early age he had received canonries at Trent, Speyer, and Augsburg. In 1541 he was appointed Imperial councillor and acted as a strong advocate of the Catholic faith against the Protestant Reformation at the 1542 Reichstag of Speyer. Thereafter, while on an embassy to Rome, was made a papal chamberlain and nuncio for the scheduled Council of Trent.

== Career ==
On 10 May 1543, the skilled and ambitious man backed by Emperor Charles V was elected Prince-Bishop of Augsburg; on 19 December 1544 he was appointed Cardinal of the titulus of Santa Balbina by Pope Paul III for settling the dispute with the Emperor upon the concessions he had made to several Lutheran princes of the Schmalkaldic League at the Fourth Diet of Speyer. Otto however urged on a military expedition against the revolting nobles, which the Emperor prepared by forging an alliance with the (Lutheran) Duke Maurice of Saxony, when the Protestants in 1546 sparked the Schmalkaldic War by a preventive strike against the town of Füssen, a possession of the Augsburg bishop.

Though a loyal supporter of victorious Emperor Charles V, he was dissatisfied with the terms of the Augsburg Interim. His opposition to the religious peace made him unpopular with Protestants.

He found the population of the Imperial City of Augsburg unruly, and Protestantism widespread. Through education, diocesan synods, visitations, edicts and improved religious instruction, he sought to educate the local clergy and spread Catholicism. At his residence, he founded the University of Dillingen under Pedro de Soto, now a lyceum, and the ecclesiastical seminary at Dillingen (1549–1555). In 1564 he transferred the management of these institutions to the Jesuits.

In 1549–1550 and again in 1555, he took part in the papal elections at Rome. The situation of the bishopric worsened in 1552 when it was devastated by the troops of the former ally Maurice, meanwhile Saxon Elector. The emperor's younger brother King Ferdinand I, now in charge and prepared to compromise, concluded the Peace of Passau with Maurice, which led to the 1555 Peace of Augsburg with the Lutheran princes. Otto's advice was no longer in demand and with the abdication of Charles V the next year, his powerful position finally was lost. He once more went to Rome in 1559 and was there made the head of the Inquisition and, in 1562, Cardinal-Bishop of Albano. In 1567 he held a diocesan synod at Dillingen.

From 1568 he lived full-time at Rome, where he died.

== Cultural references ==
A fictional version of him is seen in the third series of Showtime's Emmy Award–winning show The Tudors. He is played by Swedish actor Max von Sydow.

== Notes and references ==
=== Attribution ===
- .

== Bibliography ==
- Placidus Braun, Gesch. der Bischofe von Augsburg, III (Augsburg, 1814).
- Bernhard Duhr, Quellen zu einer Biogr. des Kard. Otto Truchsess von Waldburg in Hist. Jahrbuch, VII (Munich, 1886), 177–209 and XX (Munich, 1899), 71–74.
- Arnold Janssen, History of the German People, tr. A. M. Christie, VI–IX (London, 1905–1908), passim.
- Truchsess, Literae ad Hosium, ed. Antonius Weber (Ratisbon, 1892).
- Antonius Weber, Cardinal Otto Truchsess in Hist.-pol. Blatter, CX (Munich, 1892), 781–796.
- Oxford University Press, Cardinal Otto Truchsess Von Waldburg And His Role As Art Dealer For Albrecht V Of Bavaria (1568–1573), by Noes M. Overbeeke (http://jhc.oxfordjournals.org/content/6/2/173.full.pdf+html).

Catholic Church titles
Preceded by Christoph von Stadion	Prince-Bishop of Augsburg; 1543 – 1573	Succeeded by Johann Eglof von Knöringen
