= Max Joseph Oertel =

German physician (1835–1897)

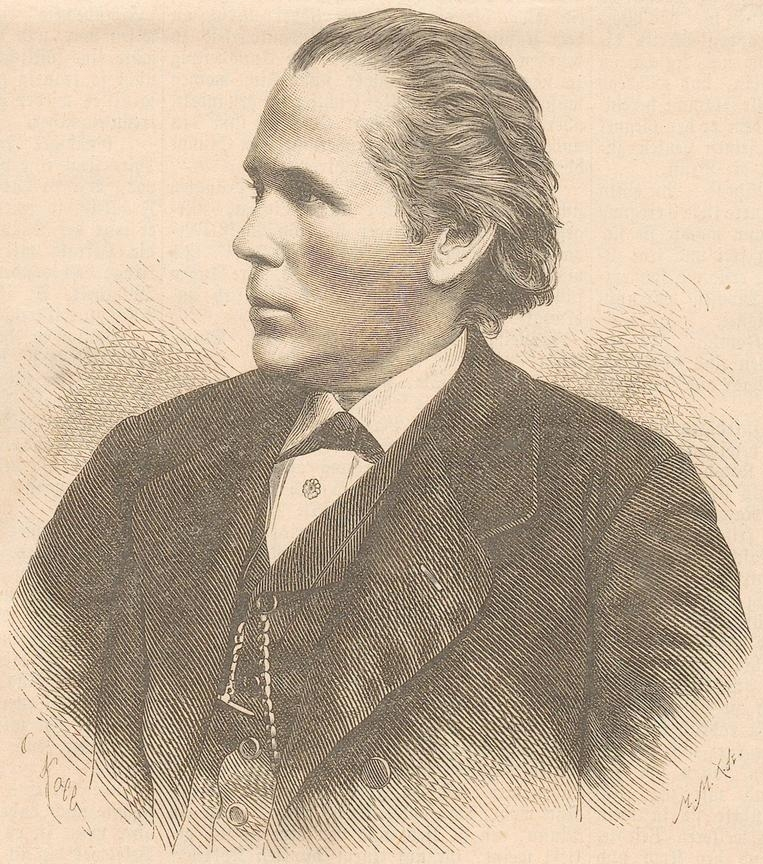
Max Joseph Oertel.

Max Joseph Oertel (20 March 1835 – 17 July 1897) was a German physician. He developed a system for the correction of respiratory troubles, and invented the laryngeal stroboscope.

== Biography ==
Oertel was a native of Dillingen. In 1863, he obtained his medical doctorate from the Ludwig-Maximilians-Universität München, where he spent the following four years as assistant to Karl von Pfeufer (1806-1869). In 1867, he received his habilitation, attaining a professorship at the Ludwig-Maximilians-Universität München in 1876.

He is credited with being the first physician to use a laryngeal stroboscope for examination of the larynx. He combined a stroboscopic lamp with a laryngeal mirror in order to study "vocal movements" in different registers. Application of the strobe light allowed him to view the vibrating vocal cords in slow motion, thus enabling detailed views of the larynx in an open or closed position.

Oertel was the author of a number of written works on cardiac, circulatory and obesity disorders, and was an early advocate of the "terrain cure", a set of therapeutic exercises that involved graduated hiking and climbing.

Oertel made contributions to the study of diphtheria by reproducing the disease in laboratory rabbits.

== Selected writings ==
- Ueber den laryngologischen Unterricht, 1878 – On laryngology lessons.
- Respiratorische Therapie, 1882 – Respiratory therapy.
- Therapie der Kreislaufs-Störungen, etc. 1884 – Therapy for circulation disorders.
- Ueber Terrain-Curorte zur Behandlung von Kranken mit Kreislaufs-Störungen, etc. 1886 – Terrain Cure to treat patients with circulation disorders.
- Die pathogenese der epidemischen Diphtherie : nach ihrer histologischen Begründung, 1887 – Pathogenesis of the diphtheria epidemic.
