= Sigismund Francis, Archduke of Austria =

Archduke of Further Austria (1630–1665)

Sigismund Francis
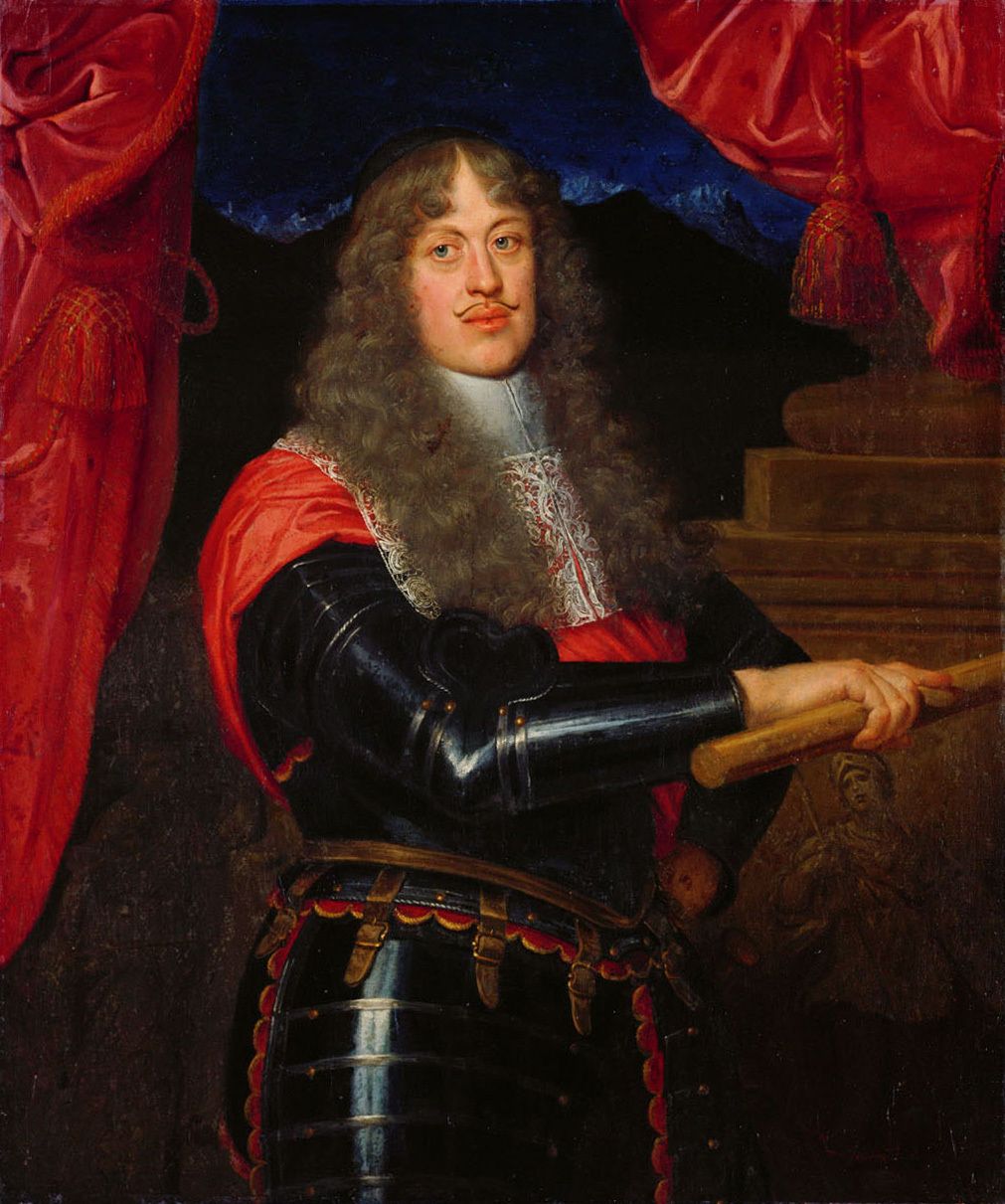
- Portrait by Giovanni Maria Morandi, c. 1665

Archduke of Further Austria
- Reign: 30 December 1662 – 25 June 1665
- Predecessor: Ferdinand Charles
- Successor: Leopold I, Holy Roman Emperor
- Born: 27 November 1630; Innsbruck, County of Tyrol
- Died: 25 July 1665 (aged 34); Innsbruck, County of Tyrol
- Spouse: Hedwig of Sulzbach (m. 1665)
- House: Habsburg
- Father: Leopold V, Archduke of Austria
- Mother: Claudia de' Medici
- Religion: Roman Catholicism

Sigismund Francis, Archduke of Further Austria (27 November 1630 – 25 June 1665) was the ruler of Further Austria including Tyrol from 1662 to 1665.

== Biography ==
He was born at Innsbruck, the second son of Leopold V, Archduke of Austria and Claudia de' Medici. He was appointed as Prince-bishop of Augsburg in 1646. In 1653, he became bishop of Gurk and in 1659 Prince-bishop of Trent. He was never ordained as a priest or consecrated as a bishop.

In 1662 he was put forth by his cousin Leopold I, Holy Roman Emperor as a candidate for bishop of Strasbourg. This included large cash incentives to the cathedral chapter and a promise that Sigismund would be a very hands off ruler. After the 1662 death of his brother Archduke Ferdinand Charles of Austria, he became Archduke of Further Austria, and therefore withdrew from the candidacy for the bishopric. He was more able than his brother and could have made him a good ruler, but with his early death in 1665, the younger Tyrolean line of the House of Habsburg ended. Leopold I, who as the heir male succeeded Sigismund Francis, took direct control over the government of Further Austria and Tyrol.

He married Hedwig of the Palatinate-Sulzbach on 3 June 1665, and died in Innsbruck twenty-two days later of an illness.

== Ancestors ==
Ancestors of Sigismund Francis, Archduke of Austria

8. Ferdinand I, Holy Roman Emperor (= 22)
4. Charles II, Archduke of Austria
9. Anna of Bohemia and Hungary (= 23)
2. Leopold V, Archduke of Austria
10. Albert V, Duke of Bavaria
5. Maria Anna of Bavaria
11. Anna of Austria
1. Sigismund Francis, Archduke of Austria
12. Cosimo I de' Medici, Grand Duke of Tuscany
6. Ferdinando I de' Medici, Grand Duke of Tuscany
13. Eleanor de Toledo
3. Claudia de' Medici
14. Charles III, Duke of Lorraine
7. Christina of Lorraine
15. Claude of Valois

== Male-line family tree ==
House of Habsburg

Original line
Albert; Count of Habsburg c. 1188–1239
Rudolf I of Germany c. 1218–1291
Albert I of Germany; 1255–1308	Hartmann; 1263–1281	Rudolf II; Duke of Austria; 1270–1290
Rudolf I of Bohemia; 1281–1307	Frederick the Fair c. 1289–1330	Leopold I Duke of Austria; 1290–1326	Albert II; Duke of Austria; 1298–1358	Henry the Friendly; 1299–1327	Otto; Duke of Austria; 1301–1339	John; Parricida c. 1290–1312/1313
Albertinian line	Leopoldian line
Rudolf IV; Duke of Austria; 1339–1365	Frederick III; 1347–1362	Albert III; Duke of Austria; 1349–1395	Leopold III; Duke of Austria; 1351–1386	Frederick II; Duke of Austria; 1327–1344	Leopold II; Duke of Austria; 1328–1344
Albert IV; Duke of Austria; 1377–1404	William; Duke of Austria c. 1370–1406	Leopold IV; Duke of Austria; 1371–1411	Ernest; Duke of Austria; 1377–1424	Frederick IV; Duke of Austria; 1382–1439
Albert II of Germany; 1397–1439	Frederick III; HRE; 1415–1493	Albert VI; Archduke of Austria; 1418–1463	Sigismund; Archduke of Austria; 1427–1496
Ladislaus the Posthumous; 1440–1457	Maximilian I HRE; 1459–1519
Philip I of Castile; 1478–1506
Spanish / Iberian line	Austrian / HRE line
Charles V HRE; 1500–1558	Ferdinand I HRE; 1503–1564
Philip II of Spain; 1527–1598	Maximilian II; HRE; 1527–1576	Ferdinand II; Archduke of Austria; 1529–1595	Charles II; Archduke of Austria; 1540–1590
Carlos; Prince of Asturias; 1545–1568	Philip III of Spain; 1578–1621	Rudolf II; HRE; 1552–1612	Ernest of Austria; 1553–1595	Matthias; HRE; 1557–1619	Maximilian III; Archduke of Austria; 1558–1618	Albert VII; Archduke of Austria; 1559–1621	Wenceslaus; Archduke of Austria; 1561–1578	Andrew; Margrave of Burgau; 1558–1600	Charles; Margrave of Burgau; 1560–1618	Ferdinand II; HRE; 1578–1637	Maximilian Ernest of Austria; 1583–1616	Leopold V Archduke of Austria; 1586–1632	Charles of Austria; 1590–1624
Philip IV of Spain; 1605–1665	Charles of Austria; 1607–1632	Ferdinand of Austria; 1609–1641	John-Charles of Austria; 1605–1619	Ferdinand III; HRE; 1608–1657	Leopold Wilhelm of Austria; 1614–1662	Ferdinand Charles; Archduke of Austria; 1628–1662	Sigismund Francis; Archduke of Austria; 1630–1665
Balthasar Charles; Prince of Asturias; 1629–1646	Charles II of Spain; 1661–1700	Ferdinand IV; King of the Romans; 1633–1654	Leopold I HRE; 1640–1705	Charles Joseph of Austria; 1649–1664
Joseph I HRE; 1678–1711	Charles VI; HRE; 1685–1740
Lorraine
Maria Theresa; HRE; 1740–1780	Francis I HRE; 1745–1765
Habsburg-Lorraine
Joseph II; HRE; 1765–1790	Leopold II; HRE; 1790–1792
Francis II; HRE; 1792–1806

== Notes and references ==
=== Bibliography ===
- O'Connor, John T. (1978). Negotiator out of Season. University of Georgia Press. ISBN 0-8203-0436-0.

Regnal titles
Preceded by Ferdinand Charles	Archduke of Further Austria; 1662 – 1665	Succeeded by Leopold VI
Catholic Church titles
Preceded by Heinrich von Knöringen	Prince-Bishop of Augsburg; 1646 – 1665	Succeeded by Johann Christoph von Freyberg-Allmendingen
Preceded by Franz von Lodron	Bishop of Gurk; 1653 – 1665	Succeeded by Wenzeslaus von Thun
Preceded by Carlo Emanuele di Madruzzo	Prince-Bishop of Trent; 1659 – 1665	Succeeded by Ernst Adalbert von Harrach
