= Peter von Schaumberg =

Bishop of Augsburg from 1424 to 1469

Peter I of Augsburg
- Prince-Bishop of Augsburg
- Diocese: Augsburg
- In office: 27 February 1424 – 12 April 1469
- Predecessor: Anselm von Nenningen
- Successor: John II of Werdenberg

Personal details
- Born: Peter von Schaumberg; 22 February 1388 Mitwitz in Franken
- Died: 12 April 1469 (aged 81) Augsburg
- Denomination: Roman Catholic

Peter von Schaumberg (22 February 1388 – 12 April 1469) was Prince-Bishop of Augsburg in the 15th century. A member of the nobility, he studied at the Universities of Heidelberg and of Bologna. The bishop was a skilled diplomat and negotiator.

== Life ==
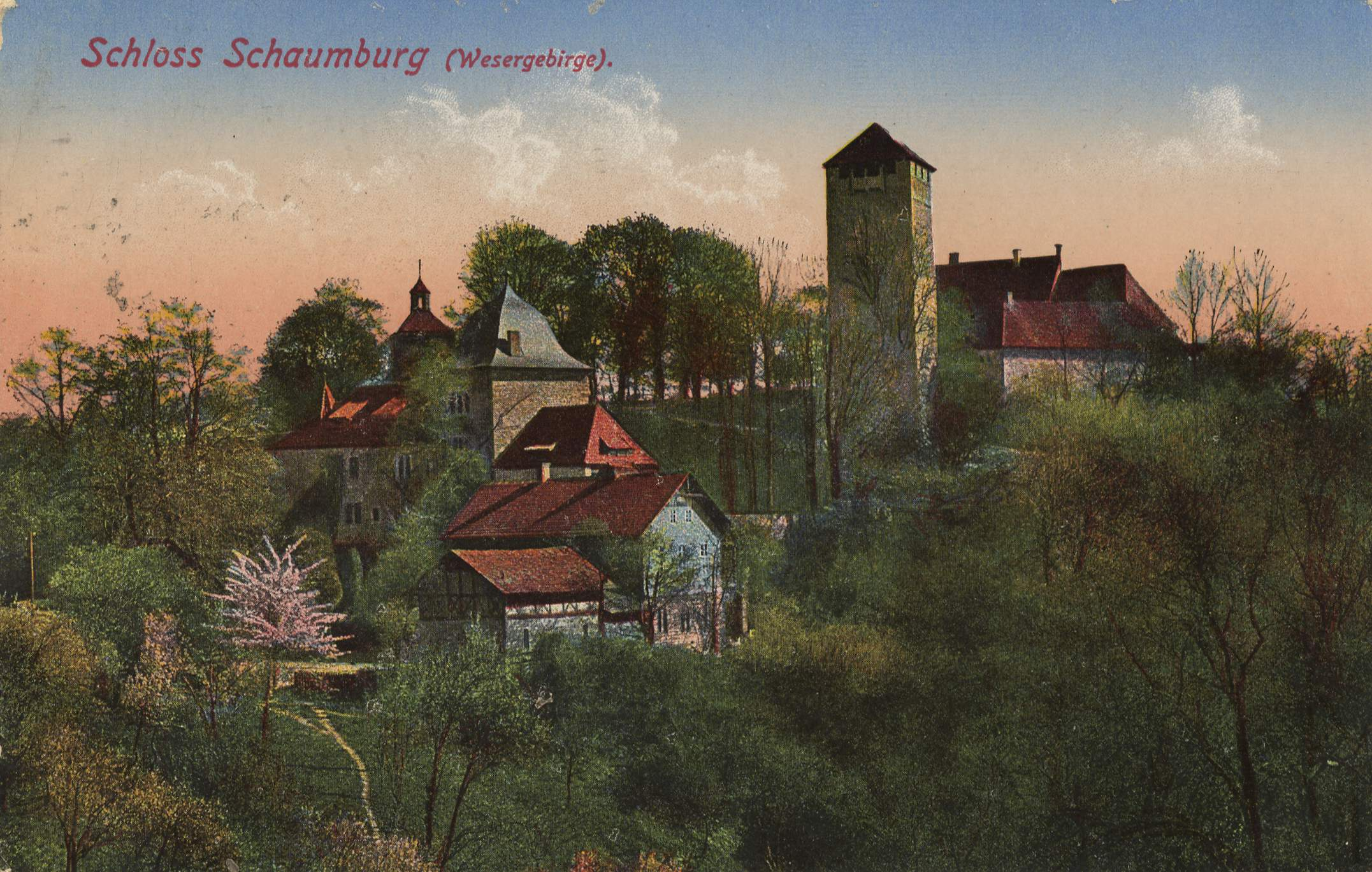
Schloss Schaumburg

Peter von Schaumberg came from the Thuringian-Franconian noble family von Schaumberg. The family had an ancestral castle Schaumburg in southern Thuringia on the border with Bavaria. His parents were George IV von Schaumberg and his wife, Elizabeth von Schweinshaupten. He studied at the Würzburg Cathedral School, and later the University of Heidelberg. In 1419 he began studying law at the University of Bologna.

In 1422 he became vicar general of the diocese of Bamburg, and archdeacon the following year. Because of his good relations with Pope Martin V, he was named a papal chamberlain. After a schismatic election in 1423, Pope Martin V prevailed in the canons of Würzburg and Bamberg, and named Peter von Schaumberg Bishop of Augsburg on 27 February 1424, a post he held until his death in 1469. He attended the Council of Basel in 1432 and represented the king at the Diet in Mainz in 1439. Frederick III considered him a skilful, and legally adept diplomat. Through his negotiating skills, he managed to keep his diocese largely out of armed conflicts with his neighbors.

He is considered a peaceful prince who increased the prosperity of the diocese. He opened up his territory by a road from Buchloe to Füssen. He held three synods and issued numerous regulations for clergy and monasteries. His goals were to combat the decay of morals and increasing secularization. He promoted science and music, made a significant donation of books to Saint Mang zu Füssen and left his movable property including the valuable library to the cathedral chapter.

Pope Eugenius IV raised him to the rank of cardinal in the consistory of 18 December 1439, and appointed him Cardinal-priest of Saint Vitalis on 8 January 1440. He apparently received the cardinal's hat from Pope Nicholas V on his trip to Rome in 1450. Under Pope Paul II, he was a legate for the German area. At his request, Pope Pius II appointed the canon Johannes Gf. von Werdenberg as coadjutor with the right of succession.

He died in Augsburg on 12 April 1469.

== Bibliography ==
- "Peter Cardinal von Schaumberg [Catholic-Hierarchy]". catholic-hierarchy.org.
- "Die Bischöfe von Augsburg". augsburger-gedenktage.de.

Catholic Church titles
Preceded by Anselm von Nenningen	Prince-Bishop of Augsburg; 1424 – 1469	Succeeded by John II of Werdenberg
