= Friedrich von Hohenzollern =

Bishop of Augsburg from 1486 to 1505

- Prince-Bishop of Augsburg
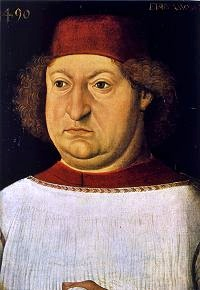
- Bishop Friedrich von Hohenzollern, portrait by Hans Burgkmair
- Diocese: Augsburg
- In office: 21 March 1486 – 1505
- Predecessor: John II of Werdenberg
- Successor: Heinrich von Lichtenau

Personal details
- Born: Friedrich von Hohenzollern; 1449 Hohenzollern Castle
- Died: 8 March 1505 (aged 55–56)
- Denomination: Roman Catholic

Friedrich von Hohenzollern (1449 – 8 March 1505) was Prince-Bishop of Augsburg from 1486 to 1505.

== Biography ==
Friedrich von Hohenzollern was born in Hohenzollern in 1449. He was a son of Jobst Nikolaus I, Count of Hohenzollern. In 1478, he was ordained as a priest in Mainz.

The cathedral chapter of Augsburg Cathedral elected him Prince-Bishop of Augsburg on 21 March 1486. Pope Innocent VIII confirmed his appointment on 21 June 1486 and he was consecrated as a bishop by Otto von Sonnenberg, Bishop of Constance, on 17 September 1486.

He died on 8 March 1505.

Catholic Church titles
Preceded by John II of Werdenberg	Prince-Bishop of Augsburg; 1486 – 1505	Succeeded by Heinrich von Lichtenau
