= Heinrich von Lichtenau =

Bishop of Augsburg from 1505 to 1517

- Prince-Bishop of Augsburg
- Diocese: Augsburg
- In office: 1 April 1505 – 12 April 1517
- Predecessor: Friedrich von Hohenzollern
- Successor: Christoph von Stadion

Personal details
- Born: Heinrich von Lichtenau; 1444 Mindelheim
- Died: 12 April 1517 (aged 72–73)
- Denomination: Roman Catholic

Heinrich von Lichtenau (1444 – 12 April 1517) was Prince-Bishop of Augsburg from 1505 to 1517.

== Biography ==
Heinrich von Lichtenau was born in Mindelheim in 1444. He was ordained as a priest in Augsburg in 1484.

The cathedral chapter of Augsburg Cathedral elected him Prince-Bishop of Augsburg on 1 April 1505. Pope Julius II confirmed his appointment on 7 May 1505, and he was consecrated as a bishop by Gabriel von Eyb, Bishop of Eichstätt, on 27 July 1505.

He died on 12 April 1517.

== Notes and references ==
Catholic Church titles
Preceded by Friedrich von Hohenzollern	Prince-Bishop of Augsburg; 1505 – 1517	Succeeded by Christoph von Stadion
