= Francis Xavier Schmalzgrueber =

German Canon law jurist

Francis Xavier Schmalzgrueber (9 October 1663 – 7 November 1735) was a German Jesuit canonist.

Schmalzgrueber was born at Griesbach, Bavaria. Entering the Society of Jesus in 1679, he made his studies at the University of Ingolstadt, obtaining the doctorate both in theology and canon law. He taught humanities at the Jesuit College Munich, the University of Dillingen, and in Neuburg an der Donau; philosophy at the Jesuit College in Mindelheim, the Jesuit College in Augsburg, and the University of Ingolstadt; dogmatic theology at the University of Innsbruck, and the Jesuit College in Lucerne (predecessor of the University of Lucerne). From 1703 to 1716 (with an interruption of two years when he occupied the chair of moral theology), he was professor of canon law, alternating between the University of Dillingen and the University of Ingolstadt. He was twice chancellor of the University of Dillingen; for two years censor of books for the Jesuits at Rome, and for a like period prefect of studies at the Jesuit College Munich. He died in Dillingen, aged 72.

== Works ==
His chief work, Jus Ecclesiasticum Universum, first published in Ingolstadt in 1717, underwent various editions, the last appearing at Rome (1843-5) in twelve quarto volumes. A compendium of this work was styled Succincta sacrorum canonum doctrina; another, Compendium juris ecclesiastici; both were published in Augsburg in 1747. Grandclaude's work (Paris, 1882-3) is practically a compendium of Schmalzgrueber.

Other writings are:

- Judicium ecclesiasticum
- Clerus saecularis et regularis
- Sponsalia et matrimonia
- Crimen fori ecclesiastici
- Consilia seu responsa Juris

All appeared at Augsburg between 1712 and 1722.
