= Oberliezheim =

Coordinates: 48.694450°N 10.572750°E

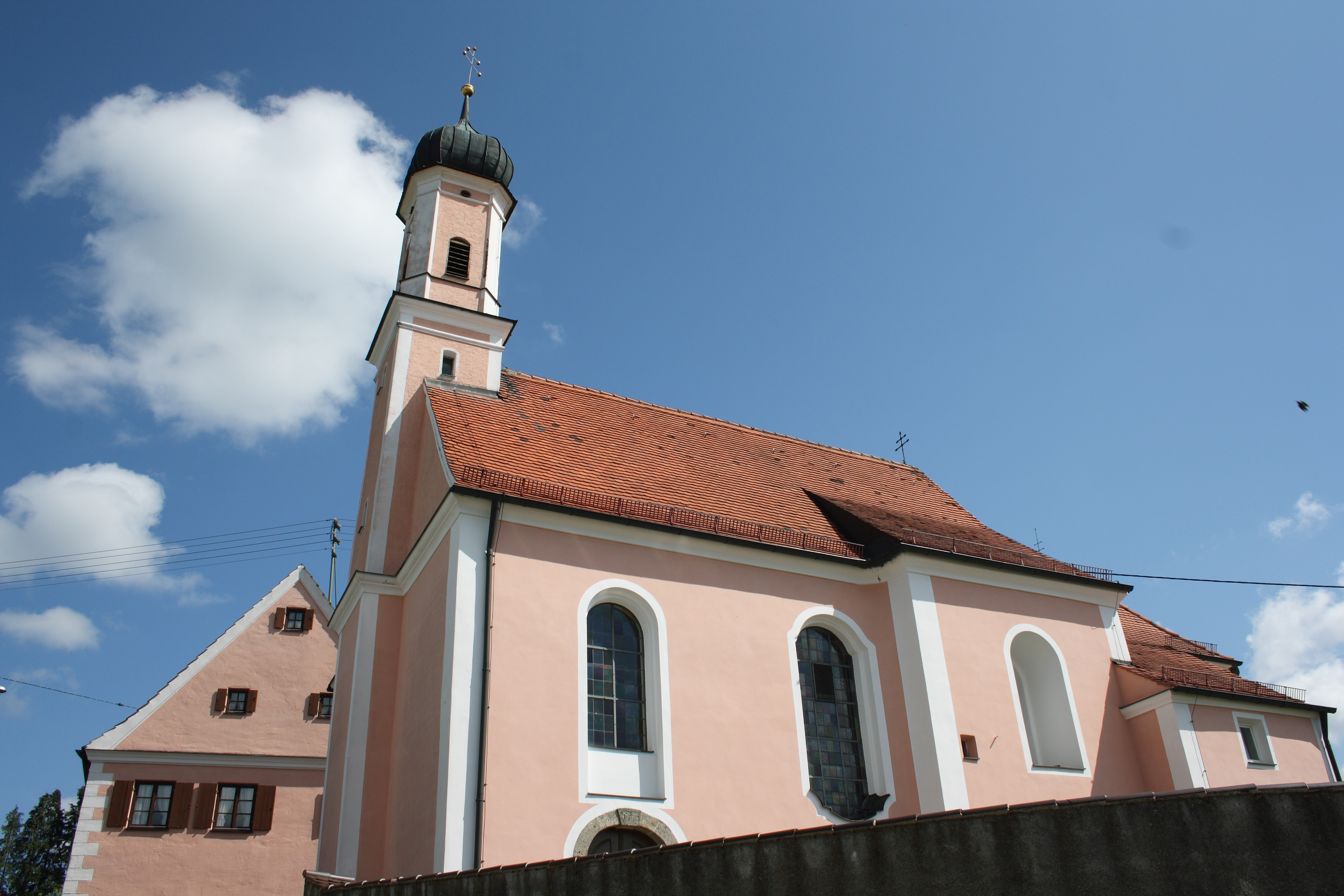
Church of Saint Leonhard

Oberliezheim is a village in Bavaria, Germany, about 20 kilometers north of Dillingen. It has a population of 200 and is administratively part of the market town of Bissingen. The village is situated between the Danube river and the famous crater Ries.

The village recently celebrated the 125th anniversary of its voluntary firefighting brigade.
