= John II of Werdenberg =

Bishop of Augsburg from 1469 to 1486

- Prince-Bishop of Augsburg
- Diocese: Augsburg
- In office: 1469 – 1486
- Predecessor: Peter von Schaumberg
- Successor: Friedrich von Hohenzollern

Personal details
- Born: John II of Werdenberg c. 1430
- Died: 23 February 1486 Frankfurt am Main
- Denomination: Roman Catholic

John II of Werdenberg (c. 1430 – 23 February 1486, Frankfurt am Main) was a German nobleman and clergyman of the house of Werdenberg. From 1469 to his death he was Bishop of Augsburg.

== Family ==
He was one of sixteen children born to John IV, Count of Werdenberg-Sargans (died 1465) and his wife Elisabeth of Württemberg (1412–1476), daughter of Eberhard III, Count of Württemberg and granddaughter of Louis IV, Holy Roman Emperor. His brothers included Hugo XI of Werdenberg (died 1508), Henry XIII of Werdenberg (died 1505) and Rudolf X of Werdenberg (died 1497). His sisters Margaret of Werdenberg (died 1496) and Anna of Werdenberg (died 1497) both became abbesses of Buchau Abbey, whilst another sister Agnes of Werdenberg married Jobst Nikolaus I, Count of Hohenzollern.

== Sources ==
- "ADB:Werdenberg, Grafen von – Wikisource". de.wikisource.org.

Catholic Church titles
| Preceded by Peter von Schaumberg | Prince-Bishop of Augsburg; 1248 – 1286 | Succeeded by Friedrich von Hohenzollern |
