= Prince-Bishopric of Augsburg =

State of the Holy Roman Empire (c.888–1803)

Prince-Bishopric of Augsburg Fürstbistum Augsburg
- c. 888–1803
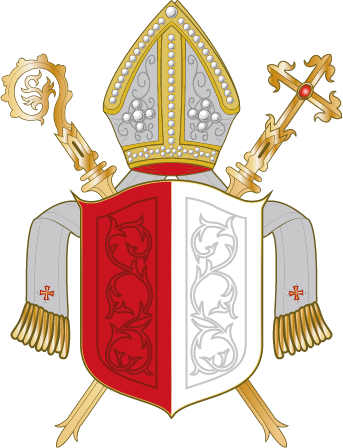
- Coat of arms

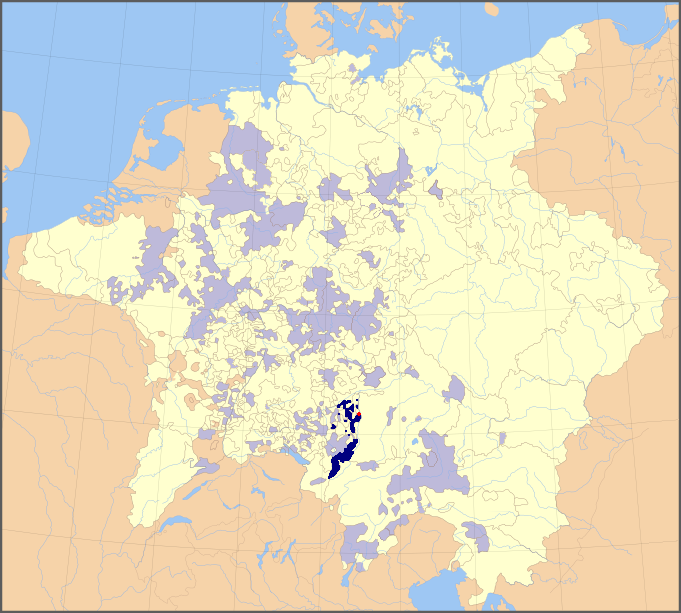
- Augsburg territory (blue) in 1648
- Status: Prince-Bishopric (State of the Holy Roman Empire)
- Capital: Augsburg, to 1276; Dillingen an der Donau
- Government: Elective principality
- Historical era: Middle Ages
  - Bishopric established: 4th century
  - Gained territory and thus, Imperial immediacy: c. 888
  - City of Augsburg gained Imperial immediacy as a Free Imperial City: 1276
  - Diet of Augsburg: Confessio Augustana: 1530
  - City joined Schmalkaldic League: 1537
  - Peace of Augsburg: 1555
  - Occupied by Sweden: 1632–1635
  - Mediatised to Bavaria: 25 February 1803
Preceded by	Succeeded by
Duchy of Swabia	Electorate of Bavaria

The Prince-Bishopric of Augsburg (German: Fürstbistum Augsburg; Hochstift Augsburg) was one of the Prince-bishoprics of the Holy Roman Empire, and belonged to the Swabian Circle. It should not be confused with the larger diocese of Augsburg, over which the prince-bishop exercised only spiritual authority.

The city of Augsburg proper, after it gained free imperial status, was a separate entity and constitutionally and politically independent of the prince-bishopric of the same name. The prince-bishopric covered some 2365 km^{2} and had approximately 100,000 inhabitants at the time it was annexed to Bavaria in the course of the German mediatization.

== History ==
=== Medieval period ===
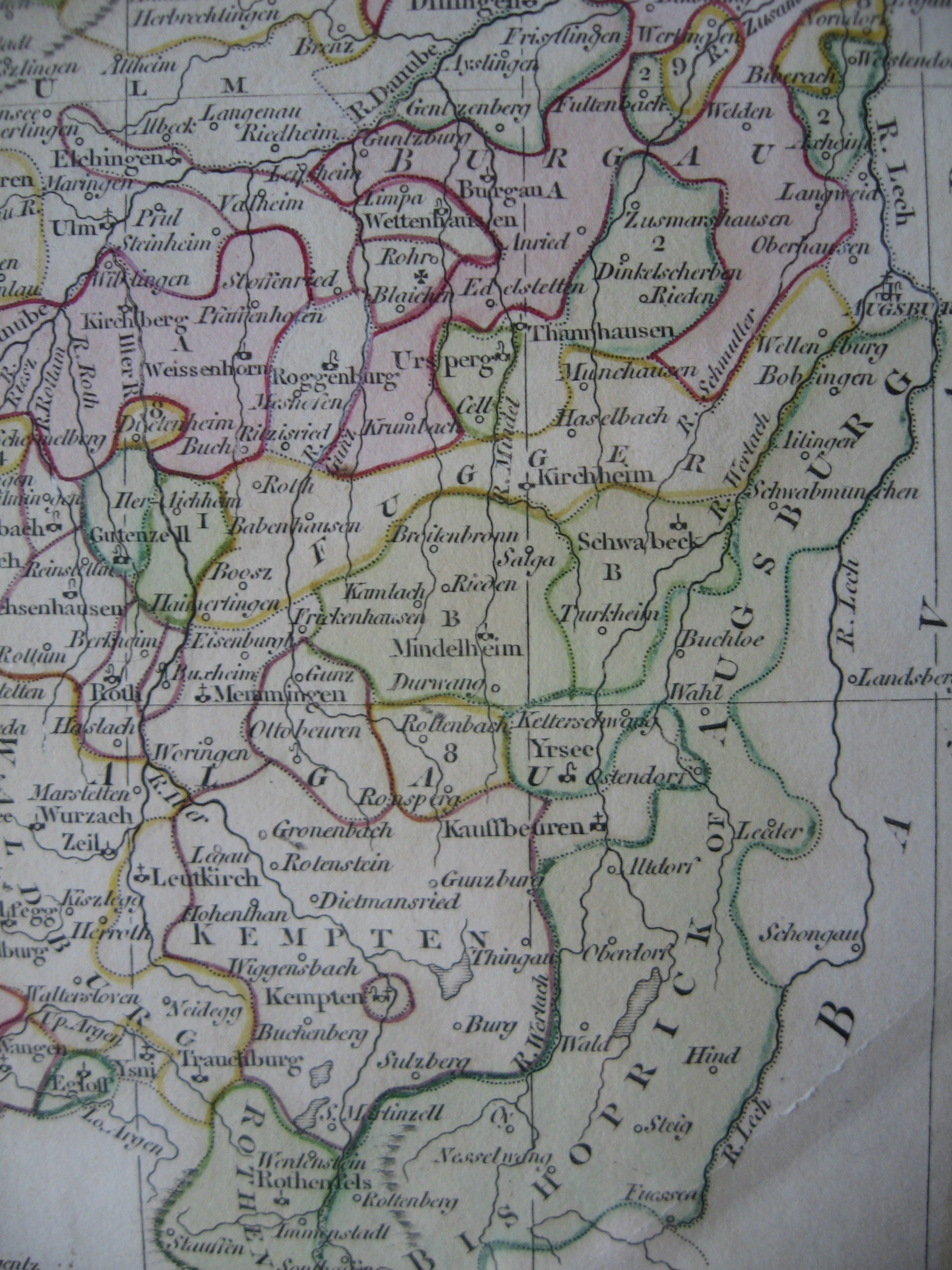
Territory of the Prince-Bishopric

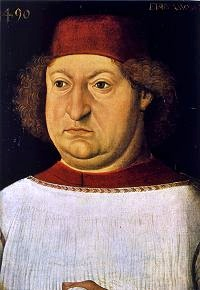
Bishop Friedrich von Zollern (1486–1505)

Nothing is known with certainty about the history of the Augsburg Church during the centuries immediately following the collapse of Roman power in Germany and the turbulence of the great migrations, but it did survive. While two catalogues of the Bishops of Augsburg, dating from the eleventh and twelfth centuries, mention several bishops from this early period, the first one whose record has been historically corroborated is Wikterp (or Wicbpert), who was bishop about 739 or 768. He took part in several synods convened in Germany by Saint Boniface. Along with Magnus of Füssen, he founded the monastery of Füssen, and, with Saint Boniface, dedicated the monastery at Benediktbeuern.

Under either Saint Wikterp or his successor, Tozzo, about whom little is known, many monasteries were established, among others the abbeys of Wessobrunn, Ellwangen, Polling and Ottobeuren. At this time, also, the see, hitherto suffragan to the Patriarchate of Aquileia, was placed among the suffragan sees of the newly founded Archdiocese of Mainz (746). Saint Simpert (c. 810), hitherto abbot of Murbach, and a relative of Charlemagne, renovated many churches and monasteries laid waste in the wars of the Franks and Bavarians, and during the incursions of the Avari; he built the first cathedral of Augsburg in honour of the Virgin Mary; and obtained from the Emperor Charlemagne an exact definition of his diocesan limits. His jurisdiction extended at that time from the Iller eastward over the Lech, north of the Danube to the Alb, and south to the spurs of the Alps. Moreover, various estates and villages in the valley of the Danube, and in Tyrol, belonged to the diocese.

Among the bishops of the following period, a certain number are especially prominent, either on account of the offices they filled in the Empire, or for their personal qualifications; thus Witgar, Chancellor and Archchaplain of Louis the German; Adalbero (887–910), of the line of the Counts of Dillingen, confidant and friend of Emperor Arnulf, who entrusted Adalbero with the education of his son, the German King Louis the Child, distinguished for generosity to the monasteries. The See of Augsburg reached the period of its greatest splendor under Saint Ulrich (923–973). He sought to improve the low moral and social condition of the clergy by the reformation of existing schools and the establishment of new ones. He provided for the poor and rebuilt decayed churches and monasteries. During the incursion of the Hungarians and the siege of Augsburg (955), he sustained the courage of the citizens, compelled the Hungarians to withdraw, and contributed much to the decisive victory on the Lechfeld (955). He built churches in honor of Saint Afra and Saint John, founded the monastery of Saint Stephen for Benedictine nuns. His success was largely due to the example he set his clergy and diocese.

The diocese suffered much during the episcopate of his successor, Henry I (973–982), for he sided with the foes of Emperor Otto II, and remained for several months in prison. After his liberation, he renounced his former views and bequeathed to his church his possessions at Geisenhausen. The diocese attained great splendor under Bishop Bruno (1006–1020), brother of Emperor Henry II; he restored a number of ruined monasteries, founded the church and college of St. Maurice, placed Benedictine monks in the collegiate church of St. Afra, and added to the episcopal possessions by the gift of his own inheritance of Straubing. Under Henry II of Augsburg (1047–1063), the guardian of Emperor Henry IV, the diocese secured the right of coinage and was enriched by many donations; under Embrico (or Emmerich, 1063–1077) the cathedral was dedicated (1065) and the canonicate and church of St. Peter and St. Felicitas were built.

During the last years of his episcopate, in the quarrel of Emperor Henry IV with the papacy, Embrico took the imperial side and only temporarily yielded to the papal legate. The struggle continued under his successors; four anti-bishops were set up in opposition to Siegfried II (1077–1096). Hermann, Count of Vohburg (1096 or 1097–1132) supported with treachery and cunning his claim to the see he had purchased, violently persecuted the Abbot of St. Afra and expelled him from the city. Only after the conclusion of the Concordat of Worms (1122) did Hermann obtain the confirmation of the pope and relief from excommunication. The political disturbances resulting from the dissensions between the popes and the German emperors reacted on the Church of Augsburg.

There were short periods of rest, during which ecclesiastical life received a forward impulse, as, for instance, under Bishop Walther II Count Palatine von Dillingen (1133–1152), under whom the possessions of the diocese were again consolidated and increased by his own inheritance; under Udalskalk (1184–1202), who with great ceremony placed the recently discovered bones of St. Ulrich in the new church of Sts. Ulrich and Afra. These days of peace alternated with periods of conflict into which the Bishops of Augsburg were drawn, often against their will, in their capacity as Princes of the Empire, and the life of the Church accordingly suffered decline. Under Siboto von Lechfeld (1227–1247) monasteries of the newly founded mendicant orders were first established in Augsburg.

Additional causes of conflict were the troubles that arose between the Bishops of Augsburg and the city authorities. During the struggles between the popes and the emperors, Augsburg, like other large cities throughout the greater part of Germany, attained enormous wealth, owing to the industrial and commercial activity of the citizens. From time to time efforts were made to restrict as much as possible the ancient civil rights of the bishops and their stewards, and even to abrogate them entirely. From a state of discontent, the citizens passed to open violence under the Bishop Hartmann von Dillingen (1248–1286), and wrung from the bishops many municipal liberties and advantages. A characteristic instance is the confirmation by King Rudolph I of Germany at the Imperial Diet held in Augsburg (1276) of the Stadtbuch, or municipal register, containing the ancient customs, episcopal and municipal rights, etc., specified in detail; on the same occasion Augsburg was recognized as a Free Imperial City. Hartmann bequeathed to the Church of Augsburg his paternal inheritance, including the town and castle of Dillingen. Peace reigned under the succeeding bishops, of whom Frederick I (1309–1331) acquired for his see the castle and stronghold of Füssen; Ulrich II of Schönegg (1331–1337), and his brother Henry III of Schönegg (1337–1348) remained faithful to Emperor Louis the Bavarian; Marquard of Randeck (1348–1365), again redeemed the mortgaged property of the diocese, and by the favor of Emperor Charles IV was made Patriarch of Aquileia in 1365.

New dissensions between the Prince-Bishop and the Free Imperial City arose under Burkhard von Ellerbach (1373–1404), whose accession was marked by grave discord growing out of the overthrow of the Patrizier, or aristocratic government, and the rise in municipal power of the crafts or guilds. Irritated by Burkhard's support of the nobility in their struggle with the Swabian cities, the inhabitants of Augsburg plundered the dwellings of the canons, drove some of the clergy from the city (1381), destroyed, after a short interval of respite (1388), the episcopal stronghold, the deanery, and the mint, and became almost completely independent of the bishop. Burkhard proceeded with great energy against the heresy of the Wyclifites who had gained a foothold in Augsburg and condemned to the stake five persons who refused to abjure.

After the death of Eberhard II (1404–1413), a quarrel arose in 1413 because the city of Augsburg declined to recognize the lawful bishop, Anselm von Nenningen (1413–1423), and set up in opposition Friedrich von Grafeneek who had been presented by Emperor Sigismund. This trouble was settled by Pope Martin V, who compelled both bishops to resign, and on his own authority replaced them by Peter von Schauenberg, Canon of Bamberg and Würzburg (1423–1469). Peter was endowed by the Pope with extraordinary faculties, made cardinal and legate a latere for all Germany. He worked with zeal and energy for the reformation of his diocese, held synods and made episcopal visitations in order to raise the decadent moral and intellectual life of the clergy; he restored the discipline and renewed the fallen splendor of many monasteries, canonries and collegiate churches. He completed the rebuilding of the cathedral in Gothic style, consecrated it in 1431 and in 1457 laid the cornerstone of the new church of SS Ulrich and Afra.

Succeeding prelates carried on the reformation of the diocese with no less solicitude and zeal. Among them were John II, Count of Werdenberg (1469–1486), tutor to the emperor's son, afterwards Emperor Maximilian I, who convened a synod in Dillingen, and encouraged the recently invented art of printing; Friedrich von Zollern (1486–1505) pupil of the great preacher Geiler of Kaysersberg, and founder of a college in Dillingen, who held a synod in the same city, promoted the printing of liturgical books, and greatly enriched the possessions of the diocese; Henry IV of Lichtenau (1505–1517), a great friend and benefactor of monasteries and of the poor, and patron of the arts and sciences.

During the episcopate of these bishops, Augsburg acquired, through the industry of its citizens, a worldwide commerce. Some members of its families, e.g. the Fuggers and the Welsers, were great merchants of their time; they lent large sums of money to the emperors and princes of Germany, conducted the financial enterprises of the papacy, and extended their operations to the newly discovered continent of America. Among these citizens of Augsburg famous at that time in literature and art were the humanist Conrad Peutinger; the brothers Bernard and Conrad Adelmann von Adelmannsfelden; Matthäus Lang von Wellenburg, secretary to Emperor Frederick III, and later Cardinal and Archbishop of Salzburg; the distinguished painters Hans Holbein the Elder, Burgkmair and others. With wealth, however, came a spirit of worldliness and cupidity. Pride and a refinement of culture furnished the soil in which the impending religious revolution was to find nourishment.

=== Reformation period ===
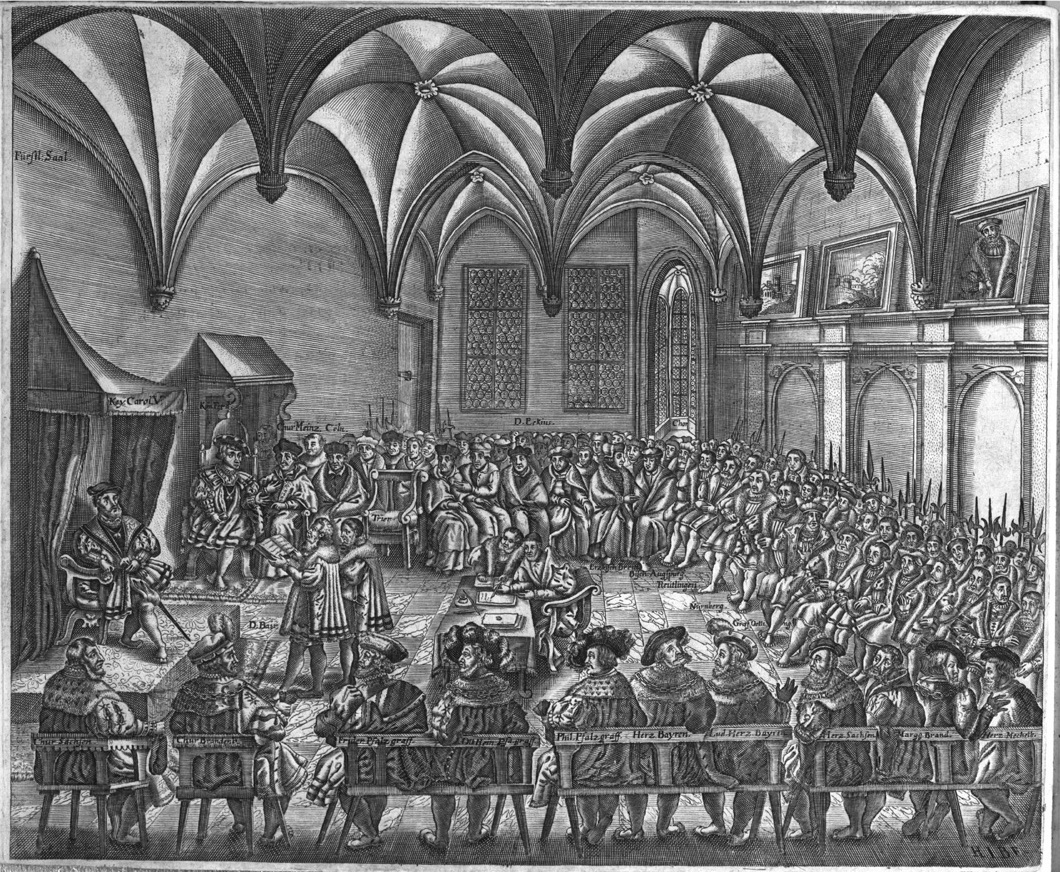
Reading of the Confessio Augustana by Emperor Charles V at the Diet of Augsburg, 1530

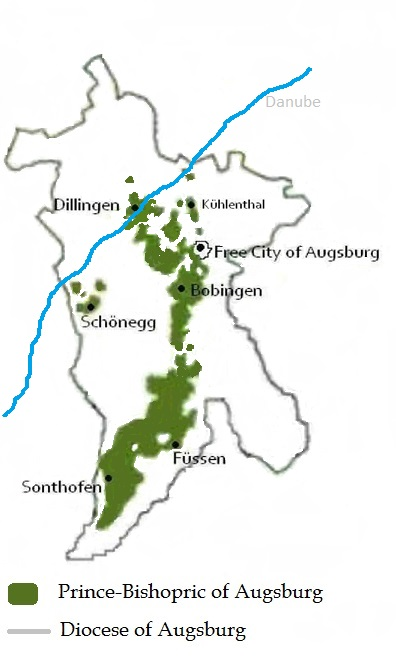
The Prince-Bishopric and the Diocese of Augsburg

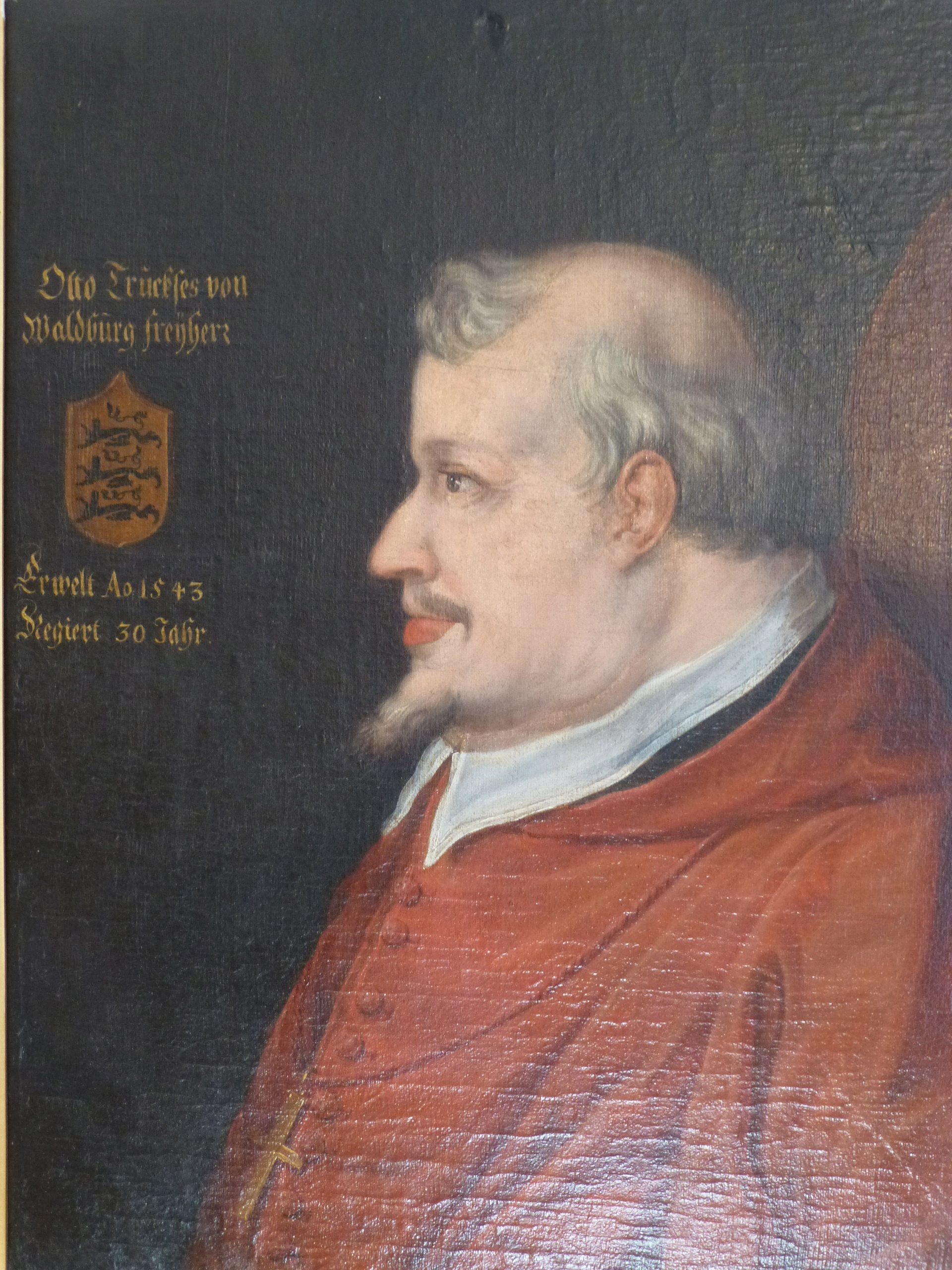
Bishop Otto von Waldburg (1543–1573)

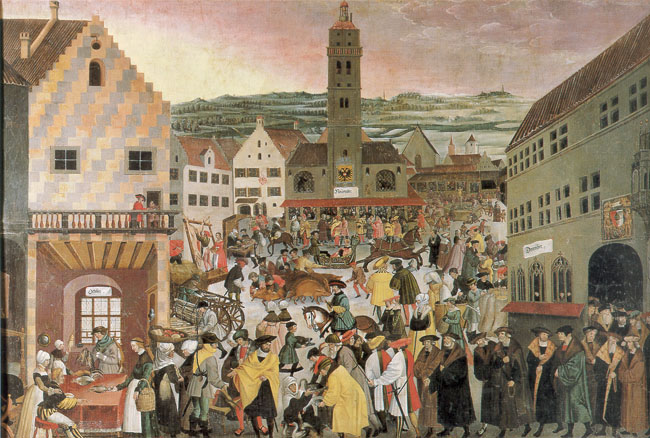
Augsburg, Perlachplatz 1550

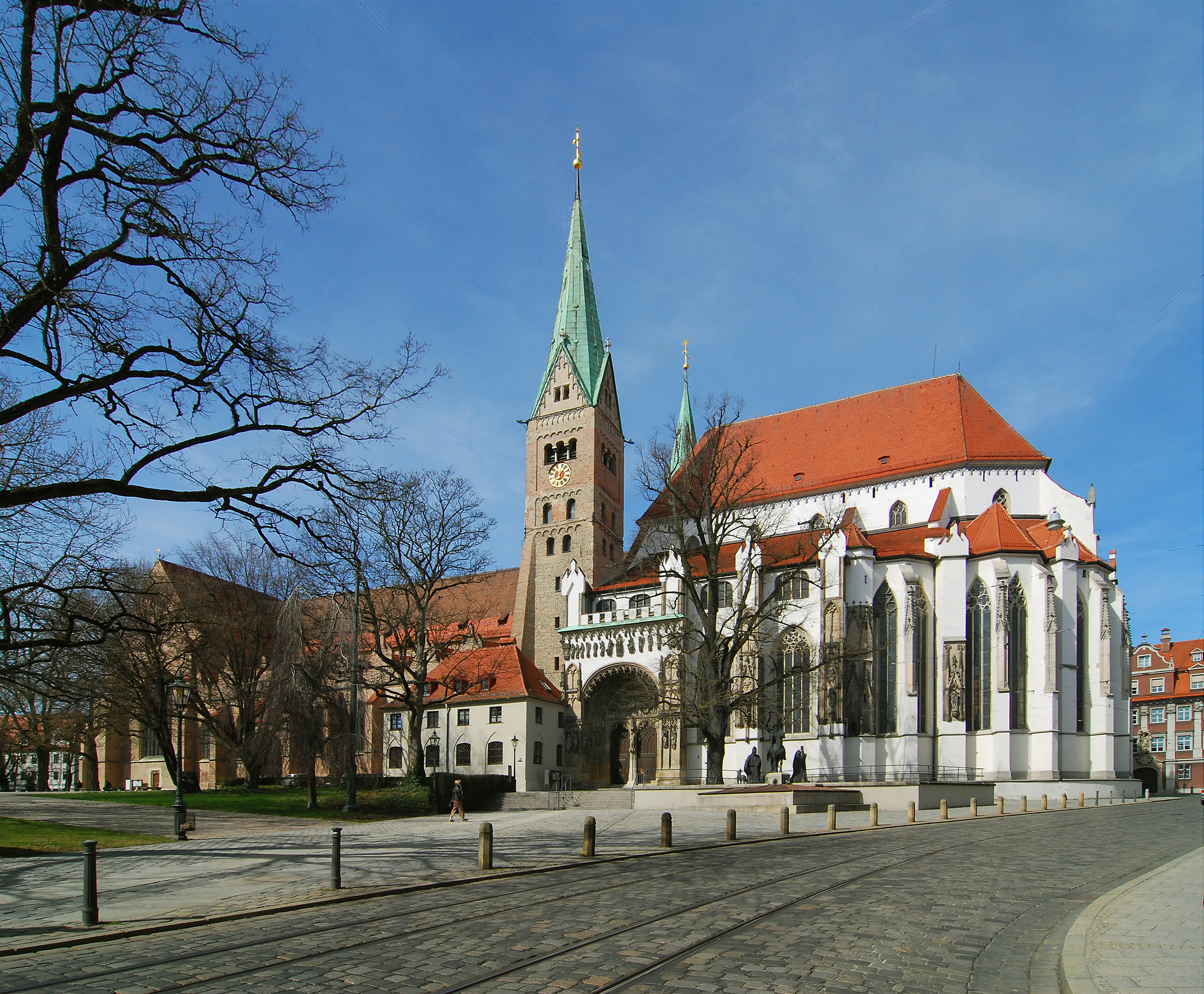
Augsburg Cathedral

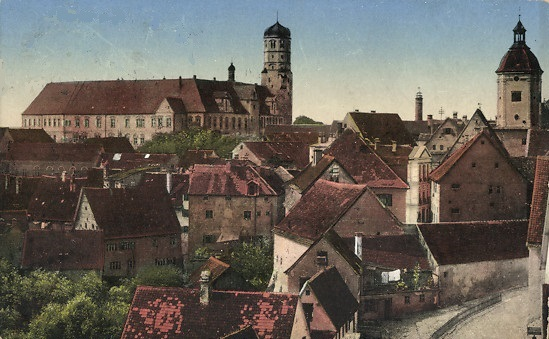
Partial view of Dillingen with the episcopal castle at the turn of the 20th century

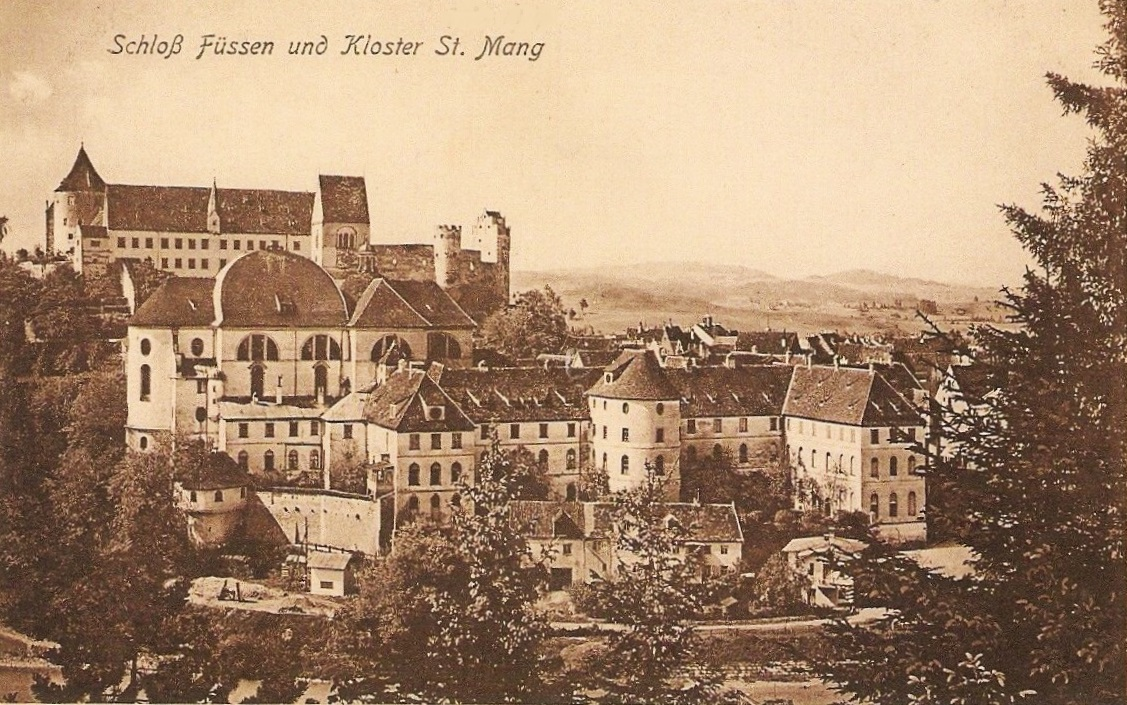
The bishop's summer palace and St. Mang's Abbey at Füssen c. 1910

The Reformation brought disaster on the Diocese of Augsburg, which extended well beyond the territory of the Prince-Bishopric of Augsburg and over which the Bishop exercised only spiritual authority. It included 1,050 parishes with more than 500,000 inhabitants. Besides the cathedral chapter, it could boast eight collegiate foundations, forty-six monasteries for men, and thirty-eight convents for women. Luther, who was summoned to vindicate himself in the presence of the papal legate before the Imperial Diet at Augsburg (1518), found enthusiastic adherents in this diocese among both the secular and regular clergy, but especially among the Carmelites, in whose convent of St. Anne he dwelt; he also found favor among the city councillors, burghers, and tradesmen. Bishop Christoph von Stadion (1517–1543) did all in his power to arrest the spread of the now teachings; he called learned men to the pulpit of the cathedral, among others Urbanus Rhegius, who, however, soon went over to Martin Luther; he convened a synod at Dillingen, at which it was forbidden to read Luther's writings; he promulgated throughout his diocese the Bull of Pope Leo X (1520) against Luther; he forbade the Carmelites, who were spreading the new doctrine, to preach; he warned the magistrates of Augsburg, Memmingen, and other places not to tolerate the reformers, and he adopted other similar measures.

Despite all this, the followers of Luther obtained the upper hand in the city council, which was facilitated by the fact that Augsburg, being a Free Imperial City, was totally independent of the Prince-Bishop. By 1524, various Catholic ecclesiastical usages, notably the observance of fast days, had been abolished in Augsburg. The apostate priests, many of whom, after Luther's example, had taken wives, were supported by the city council, and the Catholics were denied the right of preaching. During the German Peasants' War, many monasteries, institutions, and castles were destroyed.

Between 1524 and 1573, there was a significant Anabaptist presence in Augsburg. It was the venue for the Martyrs' Synod in late August 1527, an international meeting of representatives from various Anabaptist groups. A majority of the participants died as martyrs for their witness within a short time.

At the Diet of Augsburg in 1530, at which the so-called Confessio Augustana was delivered to the emperor in the chapel of the episcopal palace, the emperor issued an edict according to which all innovations were to be abolished, and Catholics reinstated in their rights and property.

The city council however, set itself up in opposition, recalled (1531) the Protestant preachers who had been expatriated, suppressed Catholic services in all churches except the cathedral (1534), and in 1537 joined the Schmalkaldic League. At the beginning of this year, a decree of the council was made, forbidding everywhere the celebration of Mass, preaching, and all ecclesiastical ceremonies, and giving to the Catholic clergy the alternative of enrolling themselves anew as citizens or leaving the city. An overwhelming majority of both secular and regular clergy chose banishment; the bishop withdrew with the cathedral chapter to Dillingen, whence he addressed to the pope and the emperor an appeal for the redress of his grievances. In the city of Augsburg the Catholic churches were seized by Lutheran and Zwinglian preachers; at the command of the council pictures were removed, and at the instigation of Bucer and others a storm of popular iconoclasm followed, resulting in the destruction of many monuments of art and antiquity.

The greatest intolerance was exercised towards the Catholics who had remained in the Free Imperial City; their schools were dissolved; parents were compelled to send their children to Lutheran institutions; it was even forbidden to hear Mass outside the city under severe penalties. Under Otto Truchsess von Waldburg (1543–1573) the first signs of improvement were noted in the attitude towards Catholics. At the outbreak of hostilities (1546) between the emperor and the Schmalkaldic League, Augsburg, as a member of the league, took up arms against Charles V, and Bishop Otto invested and plundered Füssen, and confiscated nearly all the remaining possessions of the diocese.

After the victory at Mühlberg (1547), however, the imperial troops marched against Augsburg, and the city was forced to beg for mercy, surrender twelve pieces of artillery, pay a fine, restore the greater number of churches to the Catholics and reimburse the diocese and the clergy for property confiscated. In 1547 the bishop, Otto von Truchsess, who had meanwhile been created a cardinal, returned to the city with the cathedral chapter, followed shortly after by the emperor. At the Diet held at Augsburg in 1548 the so-called "Augsburg Interim" was arranged. After a temporary occupation of the city and suppression of Catholic services by the Elector, Prince Maurice of Saxony (1551), the "Religious Peace of Augsburg" was concluded at the Diet of 1555; it was followed by a long period of peace.

The disturbances of the Reformation were more disastrous in their results throughout the diocese and adjoining lands than within the immediate precincts of Augsburg. Thus, after many perturbations and temporary restorations of the Catholic religion, the Protestants finally gained the upper hand in Württemberg, Oettingen, Neuburg, the Free Imperial Cities of Nördlingen, Memmingen, Kaufbeuren, Dinkelsbühl, Donauwörth, Ulm, in the ecclesiastical territory of Feuchtwangen and elsewhere. Altogether during these years of religious warfare, the Diocese of Augsburg lost to the Reformation about 250 parishes, 24 monasteries, and over 500 benefices. Although the religious upheaval brought with it a great loss of worldly possessions, it was not without beneficial effect on religious life of the diocese.

Bishop Christopher von Stadion, while trying to protect Catholicism from the inroads of the Reformation, had sought to strengthen and revive ecclesiastical discipline, which had sadly declined, among both the secular and regular clergy. This work was carried on even more energetically by Bishop Otto Truchsess, who achieved a fruitful counter-reformation. By frequent visitations, he sought to become familiar with existing evils, and by means of diocesan synods and a vigorous enforcement of measures against ignorant and dissolute clerics, secular and regular, he endeavored to remedy these conditions. He advanced the cause of education by founding schools; he summoned the Jesuits to his diocese, among others Blessed Peter Canisius, who from 1549, in the capacity, of cathedral preacher, confessor, and catechist, exercised a remarkable fruitful and efficacious ministry. In 1549, Bishop Otto founded a seminary in Dillingen for the training of priests, obtained from the pope (1554) a decree raising it to the rank of a university, and, in 1564, gave the direction of the new university to the Jesuits, for whom he had built a college in Dillingen. It is due to his untiring labours and those of Canisius that much larger portions of the diocese were not lost to the Church.

Under the immediate successors of Otto, the revival instituted by him progressed rapidly, and many excellent decrees were formulated. Under Marquard II von Berg (1575–1591) a pontifical boarding school (alumnatus) was founded in Dillingen, colleges were established by the Jesuits in Landsberg, and through the bounty of the Fugger family, in Augsburg (1580). Heinrich von Knöringen made bishop at the early age of twenty-eight, took especial interest in the university and the Seminary of Dillingen, both of which he enriched with many endowments; he convened several synods, converted Wolfgang, the Duke of Neuburg, to Catholicism, and during his long episcopate (1598–1646) reconciled many Protestant cities and parishes to the Catholic Church, being aided in a particular manner by the Jesuits, for whom he founded establishments in Neuburg, Memmingen, and Kaufbeuren.

By means of the Edict of Restitution of Emperor Ferdinand II (1629), vigorously and even too forcefully executed by the bishop, the Thirty Years' War first accomplished an almost complete restoration of the former possessions of the Diocese of Augsburg. The occupation of Augsburg by Gustavus Adolphus of Sweden (1632) restored temporarily the balance of power to the Protestants. Until the relief of the city by imperial troops (1635), the Catholics were hard pressed and were forced to give up all they had gained via the Edict of Restitution. Finally, the Treaty of Westphalia (1648) established equality between Catholics and Protestants and was followed by a long period of internal peace.

Owing to the losses suffered by the diocese on account of the treaty, a solemn protest was laid before the imperial chancery by Bishop Sigmund Francis, Archduke of Austria (1646–1665). This bishop, on account of his youth, ruled the diocese through administrators and later resigned his office. His successor, Johann Christopher von Freiberg (1665–1690), was particularly desirous of liquidating the heavy burden of debt borne by the chapter but was nevertheless generous towards churches and monasteries. His successor, Alexander Sigmund (1690–1737), son of the Elector Palatine, guarded the purity of doctrine in liturgical books and prayer books. Johann Friedrich von Stauffenberg (1737–1740) founded the Seminary of Meersbury and introduced missions among the people. Joseph, Landgrave of Hesse-Darmstadt (1740–1768) exhumed with great ceremony the bones of St. Ulrich and instituted an investigation into the life of Crescentia Höss of Kaufbeuren, who died in the odour of sanctity. Clemens Wenceslaus of Saxony and Poland (1768–1812) made a great number of excellent disciplinary regulations, and took measures for their execution; after the suppression of the Society of Jesus he afforded its members protection and employment in his diocese; he made a vigorous resistance to the rapidly spreading Rationalism and infidelity, and was honored by a visit from Pope Pius VI (1782).

=== French Revolution and secularisation ===
During this episcopate began the worldwide upheaval inaugurated by the French Revolution. It was destined to put an end to the temporal power of the Church in Germany and to bring about the fall of Augsburg from the dignity of a principality of the Empire. In 1802, by an act of the Delegation of the Perpetual Imperial Diet (Reichsdeputationsrezess) the territory of the secularized prince-bishopric of Augsburg was given to the Elector of Bavaria, who took possession of it on 1 December 1802.

The cathedral chapter, together with forty canonicates, forty-one benefices, nine colleges, twenty-five abbeys, thirty-four monasteries of the mendicant orders, and two convents were the victims of this act of secularisation. Unfortunately, owing to the inconsiderate conduct of the commissioners appointed by the Bavarian minister, Montgelas, innumerable artistic treasures, valuable books, and documents were destroyed. For five years after the death of the last bishop of princely rank (1812) the episcopal see remained vacant; the parts of the diocese lying outside of Bavaria were separated from it and annexed to other dioceses. It was not until 1817 that the Concordat between the Holy See and the Bavarian government reconstructed the Diocese of Augsburg and made it subject to the Metropolitan of Munich–Freising. In 1821, the territory subject to the ecclesiastical authority of Augsburg was increased by the addition of sections of the suppressed See of Constance, and the present limits were then defined.

== Prince-bishops ==
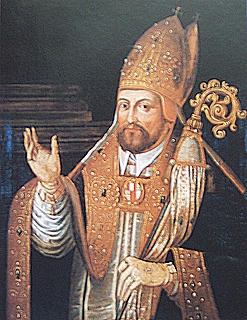
Johann Otto von Gemmingen, Prince-Bishop of Augsburg, 1591–1598

=== To 1000 ===
- Adalbero, 887–909
- Hiltin of Augsburg, 909–923
- Ulrich I, 923–973
- Henry I, 973–982
- Eticho of Augsburg (Eticho der Welfe), 982–988
- Luitold of Augsburg (Ludolf von Hohenlowe), 989–996
- Gebehard of Augsburg (Gebhard von Ammerthal), 996–1000

=== 1000 to 1300 ===
- Siegfried I, 1001–1006
- Bruno, 1006–1029
- Eberhard I, 1029–1047
- Henry II, 1047–1063
- Embrico of Augsburg, 1063–1077
- Siegfried II of Augsburg, 1077–1096
- Hermann von Vohburg, 1096–1133
- Walter I von Dillingen, 1133–1152
- Konrad von Hirscheck, 1152–1167
- Hartwig I von Lierheim, 1167–1184
- Udalschalk, 1184–1202
- Hartwig II, 1202–1208
- Siegfried III von Rechberg, 1208–1227
- Siboto von Seefeld, 1227–1247
- Hartmann of Dillingen, 1248–1286
- Siegfried IV von Algertshausen, 1286–1288
- Wolfhard von Roth, 1288–1302

=== 1300 to 1500 ===
- Degenhard von Hellenstein, 1303–1307
- Friedrich I Spät von Faimingen, 1309–1331
- Ulrich II von Schönegg, 1331–1337
- Henry III von Schönegg, 1337–1348
- Marquard of Randeck, 1348–1365
- Walter II von Hochschlitz, 1365–1369
- Johann I. Schadland, 1371–1372
- Burkhard von Ellerbach, 1373–1404
- Eberhard II von Kirchberg, 1404–1413
- Friedrich von Grafeneck, 1413–1414
- Anselm von Nenningen, 1414–1423
- Peter von Schaumberg, 1424–1469
- Johann II of Werdenberg, 1469–1486
- Friedrich von Hohenzollern, 1486–1505

=== From 1500 ===
- Heinrich von Lichtenau, 1505–1517
- Christoph von Stadion, 1517–1543
- Otto Truchsess von Waldburg, 1543–1573
- Johann Eglof von Knöringen, 1573–1575
- Marquard von Berg, 1575–1591
- Johann Otto von Gemmingen, 1591–1598
- Heinrich von Knöringen, 1599–1646
- Sigismund Francis, Archduke of Austria, 1646–1665
- Johann Christoph von Freyberg-Allmendingen, 1666–1690
- Alexander Sigismund von der Pfalz-Neuburg, 1690–1737
- Johann Franz Schenk von Stauffenberg, 1737–1740
- Joseph Ignaz Philipp von Hessen-Darmstadt, 1740–1768
- Clemens Wenceslaus of Saxony, 1768–1803

== See also ==
- Roman Catholic Diocese of Augsburg, the current Catholic bishopric
- David of Augsburg, medieval German mystic
