= Gültlingen =

- Stadtteil of Wildberg
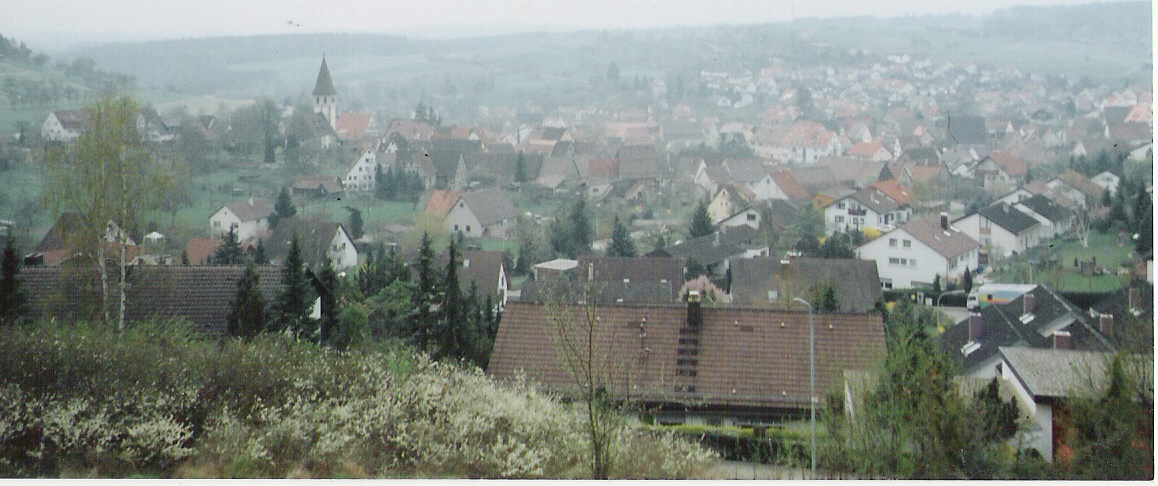
- A view of Gültlingen from the north.
- Interactive map of Gültlingen
- Location within Germany Location within Baden-Württemberg
- Coordinates: 48°38′57″N 08°46′34″E
- Country: Germany
- State: Baden-Württemberg
- Admin. region: Karlsruhe
- District: Calw
- Town: Wildberg
- Time zone: UTC+01:00 (CET)
  - Summer (DST): UTC+02:00 (CEST)
- Website: www.wildberg.de

Gültlingen is a village in Baden-Württemberg, Germany. Since 1 January 1975, it is a part (a Stadtteil) of the town Wildberg.

== History ==
The "Gültlingen Gold Helmet" (460-480 AD), was found together with other artifacts and is now in the Stuttgart State Museum. Also, graves found in the area date the beginning of the aristocratic seat of the barons of von Gültlingen in the middle 12th century.

=== Michaels Church ===
The church was built in 1465. The pulpit of Michaels Church is hand-carved wood, featuring two birds-of-paradise (German: Paradiesvogel). The church yard features two separate memorials for World War I (dedicated 1928) and World War II.

== Geography ==
Gültlingen is located in a small valley, surrounded by farm land and grazing land for sheep.

=== Gültlinger See ===
The Gültlinger See, or Gültlingen Lake, is a popular local attraction.
