= Marquard of Randeck =

Bishop of Augsburg from 1348 to 1365

- Prince-Bishop of Augsburg
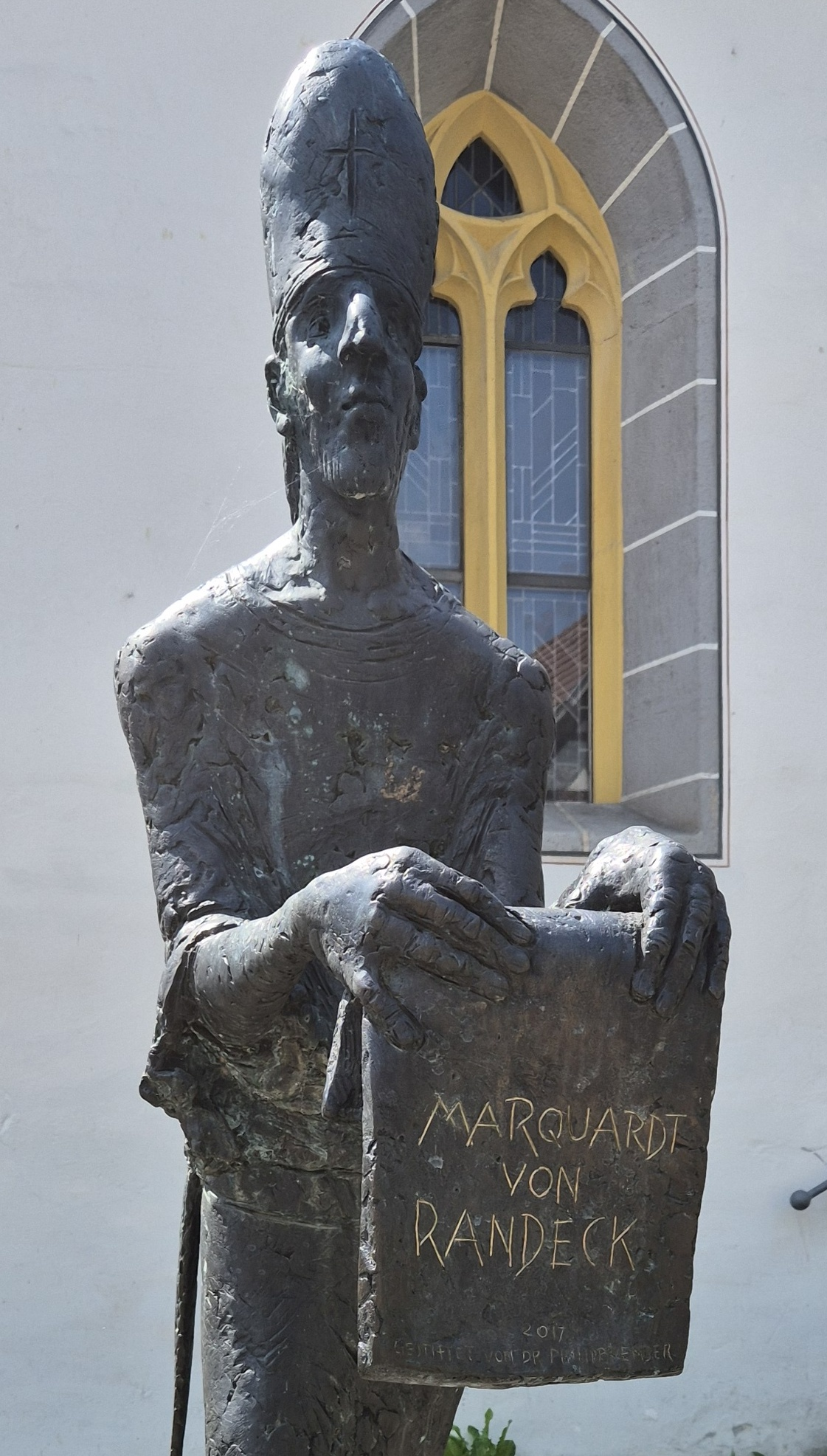
- Statue in Plochingen (Germany)
- Diocese: Augsburg
- In office: 1348 – 1365
- Predecessor: Henry III von Schönegg
- Successor: Walter II von Hochschlitz

Personal details
- Born: Marquard of Randeck; 1296 Augsburg
- Died: 3 January 1381 (aged 84–85) Trieste
- Denomination: Roman Catholic

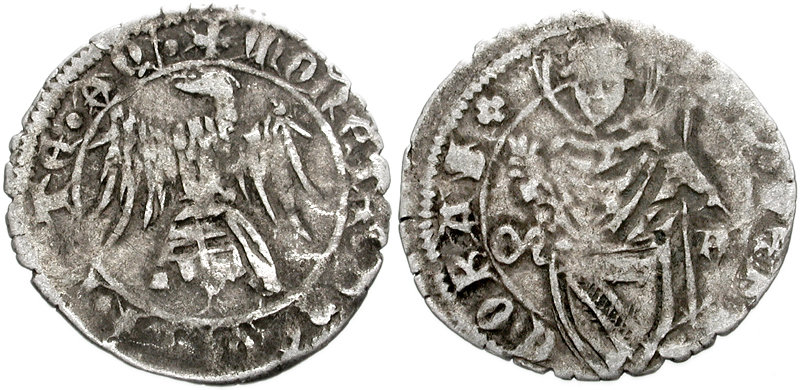
A denarius issued during the patriarchate of Marquard

Marquard of Randeck (or of Randelle; Italian: Marquardo di Randeck; 1296 - 3 January 1381) was Prince-Bishop of Augsburg from 1348 until 1365.

== Biography ==
He was born at Augsburg, the son of a knight, but was educated by his uncle, the canon of the city. He was later a chancellor of Charles IV, Holy Roman Emperor at Avignon. He was appointed as bishop of Augsburg in 1348. Six years later, he accompanied the emperor in his visit to Rome. The following year, Marquard was sent to Pisa to suppress an anti-imperial revolt and was wounded in the fray. He remained for a period at Pisa as an imperial captain and governor in Italy. In 1356 he was captured by the condottiero Lodrisio Visconti at Casorate Primo. In 1365 the emperor made him as lieutenant general in Friuli. In the same year, Pope Urban VI gave him the vacant title of Patriarch of Aquileia, and Marquard (who had to renounce Augsburg) entered at Cividale in June 1366.

Marquard received a state with numerous rebellions, such as those of Gualtiero Bertoldo IV of Spilimbergo and of the lords of Duino, and in war with Albert III, Duke of Austria and Leopold III, Duke of Austria. Marquard was able to recover all the lost lands and to force his enemies, including also the counts of Gorizia, to peace. He then devoted himself to the traditional war against the Republic of Venice, in alliance with Louis I of Hungary, the Republic of Genoa, the dukes of Austria, the counts of Gorizia and Francesco I da Carrara, lord of Padua. The Venetians besieged Trieste: Leopold III arrived with 10,000 men, supported by a Genoese contingent, but they were crushed (5 September 1369) and the city surrendered. The Austrians left the alliance, and the remaining members were again defeated on the Piave (1372) and near Treviso (1373) by the Venetian doge Andrea Contarini, who had even hired Turkish mercenaries. The two parties signed a treaty of peace on 12 September 1373.

During the war of Chioggia, the patriarch took advantage of the initial difficulties of the Venetians to invade Istria, capturing Koper and Pula. After a series of changes of possessions, Trieste was confirmed to the patriarchate at the treaty of Turin (1381), although some territories in Istria were returned to Venice.

Marquard was a prominent jurist, and during his reign, he published the Constitutiones Patriae Foriiulii, also known as Codex Marquardianus, containing the rules which regulated law in Friuli until the 18th century. He also restored the Basilica of Aquileia, damaged by an earthquake in 1348 and rebuilt in Gothic style.

Marquard died at Trieste on 3 January 1381.

== Notes and references ==
- Bianchi, G. (1877). Documenti per la storia del Friuli dal 1200 al 1400 (in Italian). Tip. J.E. Colmegna.
- Tirelli, R. (2000). I patriarchi - La spada e la croce – XV secoli di storia (in Italian).

Catholic Church titles
Preceded by Henry III of Schönegg	Prince-Bishop of Augsburg; 1348 - 1365	Succeeded by Walter II of Hochschlitz
