= University of Dillingen =

Coordinates: 48°34′39.46″N 10°29′29.76″E

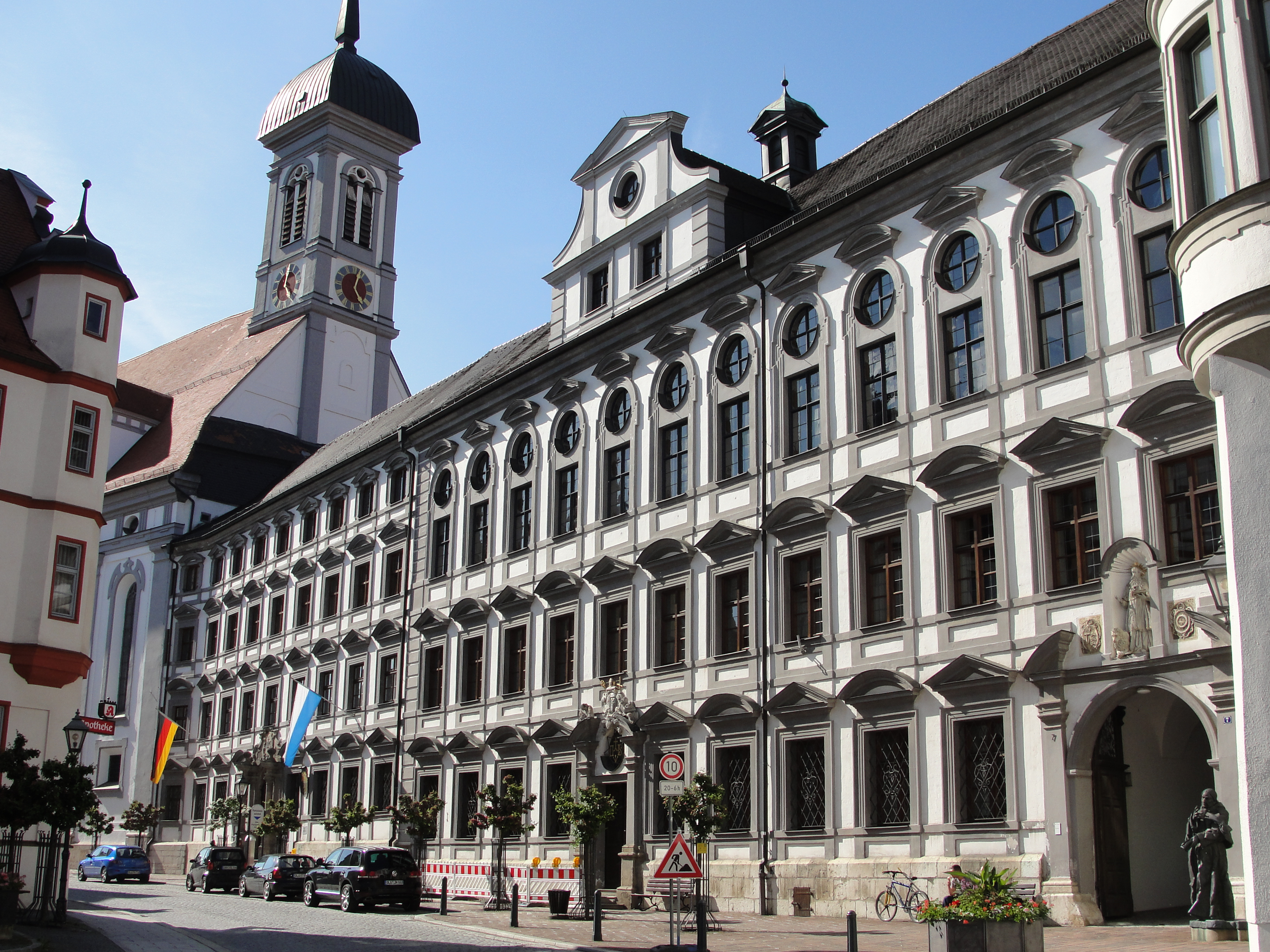
University of Dillingen

The University of Dillingen, at Dillingen an der Donau in southern Germany, existed from 1551 to 1803. It was located in Swabia, then a district of Bavaria.

== Foundation ==
Its founder was Cardinal Otto Truchsess von Waldburg, Prince-Bishop of Augsburg (1543–1573). He first established it under the title, "College of St. Jerome", and endowed it with the revenues of several monasteries which had been suppressed at the Protestant Reformation. His aim was to provide for the education of the clergy and the protection of the Roman Catholic faith. He drew up special rules regarding the practice of religion, application to study, and conduct which each student bound himself by oath to observe.

In 1551, Pope Julius III raised the college to the rank of a university and conferred on it the privileges enjoyed by other universities. Emperor Charles V ratified these privileges, and the formal inauguration took place 21 May 1554. Some of the professors, as Peter Endavianus, the first rector of Dillingen, came from Louvain University; others from Spain, among them Pedro de Soto, O.P., afterwards professor at Oxford.

Bishop Otto in 1563 gave the Jesuits, whose provincial at that time was Peter Canisius, charge of the instruction in the university, and authorized them to follow their own rules in all that pertained to organization and administration. As, however, the cathedral chapter of Augsburg would not admit the legality of this complete transfer, disputes often arose on questions of right, especially in regard to episcopal visitation, the foundation of chairs of civil law, and the appointment of professors. Nevertheless the chapter paid regularly the sums stipulated in the original document of transfer, and finally accepted the transfer as arranged on 14 June 1606, by Bishop Henry von Knöringen (1598–1646), who for that reason is called the second founder of the university.

From this date the chapter guaranteed a fixed contribution for the university and convictus (hall for clerical and some lay students). In 1641, Emperor Ferdinand III ratified the new charter in a special document which recognized the service rendered by the scientific work of the university and by the preparation which it gave young men for their duties toward Church and State.

== Later history ==
During the Swedish invasion in the Thirty Years War the revenues of the university became less regular, some of its professors were imprisoned, its students scattered, and the lectures discontinued. But after peace had been concluded the institution gradually recovered, and, in 1688, a building for university lectures was erected under Bishop John Christopher von Freyberg.

The university's charter guaranteed to all its members freedom from civil and political obligations, separate jurisdictions, and the right of precedence on public occasions. The exemption from taxes and imposts was frequently disputed by the city council and other officials. The Jesuits, in accordance with the rules of their order, renounced jurisdiction in civil and penal matters. This was exercised by the gubernator, one of the episcopal counsellors well versed in jurisprudence, while matters relating to discipline were in the hands of the rector. The right of precedence at processions and funerals occasioned several bitter feuds between the officials of the episcopal court and the faculty.

In 1610, Bishop Henry von Knöringen granted to the rector and the professors of theology the privilege of censorship; in 1747 this was modified to the effect that books printed in Dillingen needed also the approbation of the episcopal censor at Augsburg. The courses which, from the beginning, were given at the university and which were taken over by the Jesuits were humanities, philosophy, and theology. The humanities were taught in the gymnasium, which was at that time a part of the university, and they served as a preparation for the higher studies. In the beginning of the seventeenth century a faculty of jurisprudence was added with one professor of canon and one of civil law. In 1738 church history was included in the curriculum of theology. A department of medicine and surgery, rather loosely connected with the university, was established about the same time.

== Graduates ==
The statutes concerning degrees were taken from the University of Ingolstadt. The baccalaureate in theology was conferred for the first time in 1564. Between this date and 1770 the degree of bachelor of arts was conferred on 7704, that of master of arts on 5997 which numbers show the flourishing condition of letters at the university. Although the frequent changing of professors was prejudicial to their literary activity, many of them acquired fame in the fields of moral theology, canon law, philosophy, mathematics, and astronomy. Thus Jakob Illsung, Georg Stengel, and Joseph Monschein were distinguished theologians; Christopher Scheiner, professor of mathematics, invented the pantograph; while Paul Laymann, F. X. Schmalzgrueber, and Joseph Biner were jurists.

== Sodalities ==
It was at Dillingen that the first sodality of the Blessed Virgin was established in Upper Germany; this sodality carried on an active correspondence with the original sodality, the B. V. Annuntiatae in Rome, and with various local organizations. Other associations were formed for special purposes, e.g. for the veneration of the Blessed Sacrament. Some of these sodalities numbered several hundred resident members.

== Seminary ==
In the summer of 1585, a seminary was founded by Pope Gregory XIII to provide for the religious needs of Upper Germany. Its students, 20-25 in number, were young men of parts, who, after completing the course of humanities and dialectics, pledged themselves to take their degrees at the university. The students promised under oath to enter the ecclesiastical state and not to join any religious order without leave from the pope. Their expenses were defrayed by the Holy See.

This seminary existed up to the year 1798 and educated more than 4,000 priests. Through the efforts Bishop Henry von Knöringen and several member the secular clergy, a diocesan seminary accommodating twelve students was founded in 1610; its rules were identical with those of the papal seminary. A third seminary under the title of St. Joseph owed its origin to the contributions of Cardinal Otto and other benefactors. It received poor students who could no longer be accommodated in the convictus itself; they lived in special lodgings and were not obliged to receive Holy orders. Finally, another seminary for clerics was built as a supplement to the existing papal seminary; but in 1747 it was transferred to Pfaffenhausen under Bishop Joseph. In 1582 the total number of students, including those in the gymnasium, was 600; in 1618 it was 306, and in the year of the suppression of the Society of Jesus, only 210 attended, of whom 116 were studying theology, 25 jurisprudence, 74 philosophy. The gymnasium counted 125 students. The scholars did not belong exclusively to the Diocese of Augsburg; they came from all parts of Germany, and from Poland, Italy, France, and Switzerland.

== Suppression of the Jesuits, and last years of the University ==
In 1773, the Society of Jesus was suppressed, and consequently, in the autumn of the same year, the activity of the Jesuits as professors at the University of Dillingen came to an end. Prince-Bishop Clement Wenceslaus ordered that henceforth the university as well as the convictus should be directly subject to the bishop. For the new scholastic year other professors, some of whom were ex-Jesuits, were installed; but theology and canon law were taught by secular priests exclusively. The former Jesuit college took the name "Academic House".

At first the number of students was nearly the same as formerly, but the institution soon began to labor under financial difficulties owing to the confiscation of lands and revenues which had belonged to the Jesuit college. In 1786 a new charter approved by the Holy See was introduced at the university. In conformity with the practice in other universities, deans with a yearly tenure of office were placed at the head of the different faculties. The curriculum and the methods of teaching were adapted to the needs of the time; in theology the difference between primary branches (scholastic theology and philosophy) and secondary branches (canon and civil law and Biblical exegesis) was done away with. The lectures in the three faculties were given partly in Latin as before, partly in German. Rationalism and liberalism were repeatedly checked by episcopal visitations and enactments.

Among the best known professors of that period were Johann Michael Sailer in moral philosophy and pastoral theology, Patriz Benedikt Zimmer in dogmatic theology, and Weber in philosophy and mathematics. A last regulation of the prince-bishop, dated 1799, contained rules regarding attendance at church, discipline, and methods of teaching and studying. The endowments of several institutions and corporations were transferred in 1789 to the "Academic House" in order to relieve its financial difficulties, and its administration was simplified by uniting the St. Joseph Seminary and the convictus. The patronage of the city parish of Dillingen was ceded to the bishop in favor of the university with which it was incorporated. Nevertheless the expenses of the institutions so far exceeded their revenues that the existence of the university became very precarious. Hence it was several times proposed to transfer the university to a religious order, e.g. the Benedictines or the newly organized Societas de Fide Jesu.

During the scholastic year of 1798-1799, the number of students had dwindled to 109, of whom 51 were theologians distributed over three courses, 10 were attending the lectures on law and 48 those on philosophy. In 1802 the cathedral chapter of Augsburg and the university were secularized and became part of Bavaria, whose elector, by rescript of 3 November 1803, abolished the University of Dillingen. In its stead a classical gymnasium and a Lyceum for philosophy and theology were founded for the Swabian District.

== See also ==
- List of early modern universities in Europe
