= Dillingen an der Donau =

- Town
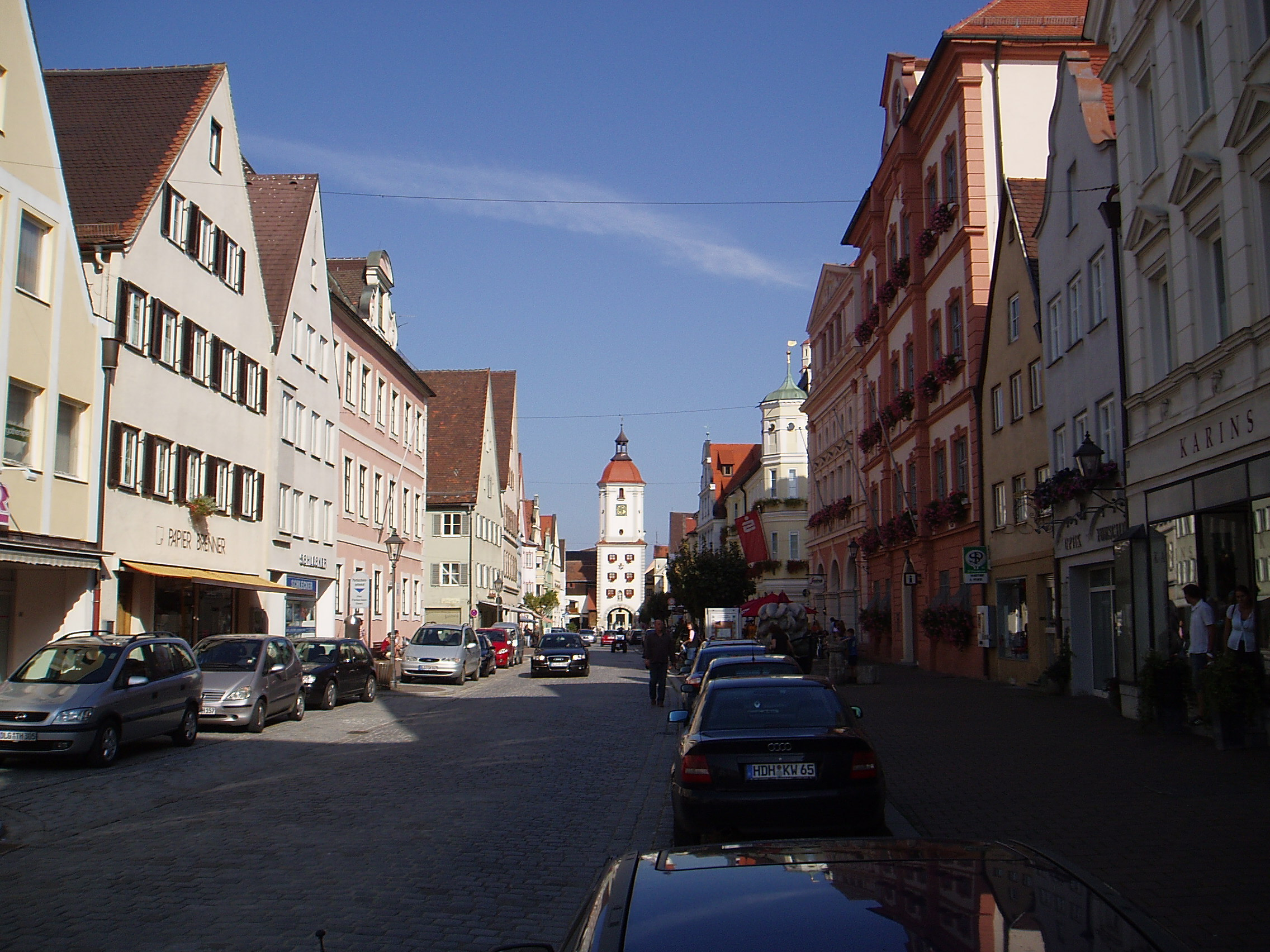
- King's Street

- Coat of arms

- Location of Dillingen an der Donau within Dillingen district
- Interactive map of Dillingen an der Donau
- Location within Germany Location within Bavaria
- Coordinates: 48°34′N 10°28′E
- Country: Germany
- State: Bavaria
- Admin. region: Schwaben
- District: Dillingen

Government
  - Mayor (2020–26): Frank Kunz (CSU)

Area
  - Total: 75.59 km^{2} (29.19 sq mi)
- Elevation: 422 m (1,385 ft)

Population (2025-12-31)
  - Total: 19,643
  - Density: 259.9/km^{2} (673.0/sq mi)
- Time zone: UTC+01:00 (CET)
  - Summer (DST): UTC+02:00 (CEST)
- Postal codes: 89407
- Dialling codes: 09071
- Vehicle registration: DLG
- Website: www.dillingen-donau.de

Dillingen an der Donau (German pronunciation: [ˈdɪlɪŋən ʔan deːɐ̯ ˈdoːnaʊ]; officially Dillingen a.d.Donau; lit. 'Dillingen on the Danube') is a town in Swabia, Bavaria, Germany. It is the administrative center of the district of Dillingen.

Besides the town of Dillingen proper, the municipality encompasses the villages of Donaualtheim, Fristingen, Hausen, Kicklingen, Schretzheim and Steinheim.

Schretzheim is notable for its 6th to 7th century Alemannic cemetery, 630 row graves in an area of 100 by 140 metres.

== History ==
The counts of Dillingen ruled from the 10th to the 13th century; in 1258 the territory was turned over to the Prince Bishops of Augsburg. After the Reformation, the prince-bishops of Augsburg moved to the Catholic city of Dillingen and made it one of the centers of the Counter-Reformation.

In 1800, during the War of the Second Coalition, the armies of the French First Republic, under command of Jean Victor Moreau, fought Habsburg regulars and Württemberg contingents, under the general command of Pál Kray. Kray had taken refuge in the fortress at Ulm; Moreau diverted his army to approach Ulm from the east and, after a small group of men captured a foothold on the northern bank of the Danube, his forces were able to move against the fortress on both sides of the river. At this battle, the culmination of the Danube Campaign of 1800, Moreau forced Kray to abandon Ulm and withdraw into eastern Bavaria.

A university was established in 1549, but was closed by Napoleon in 1804. The philosophical and theological faculties still existed in the 20th century. In 1971, however, it became a part of the Bavarian Center for the Education and Training of Teachers and Personnel Management (Akademie für Lehrerfortbildung und Personalführung). One of the largest employers in the city is Bosch and Siemens Household Appliances, producer of household appliances.

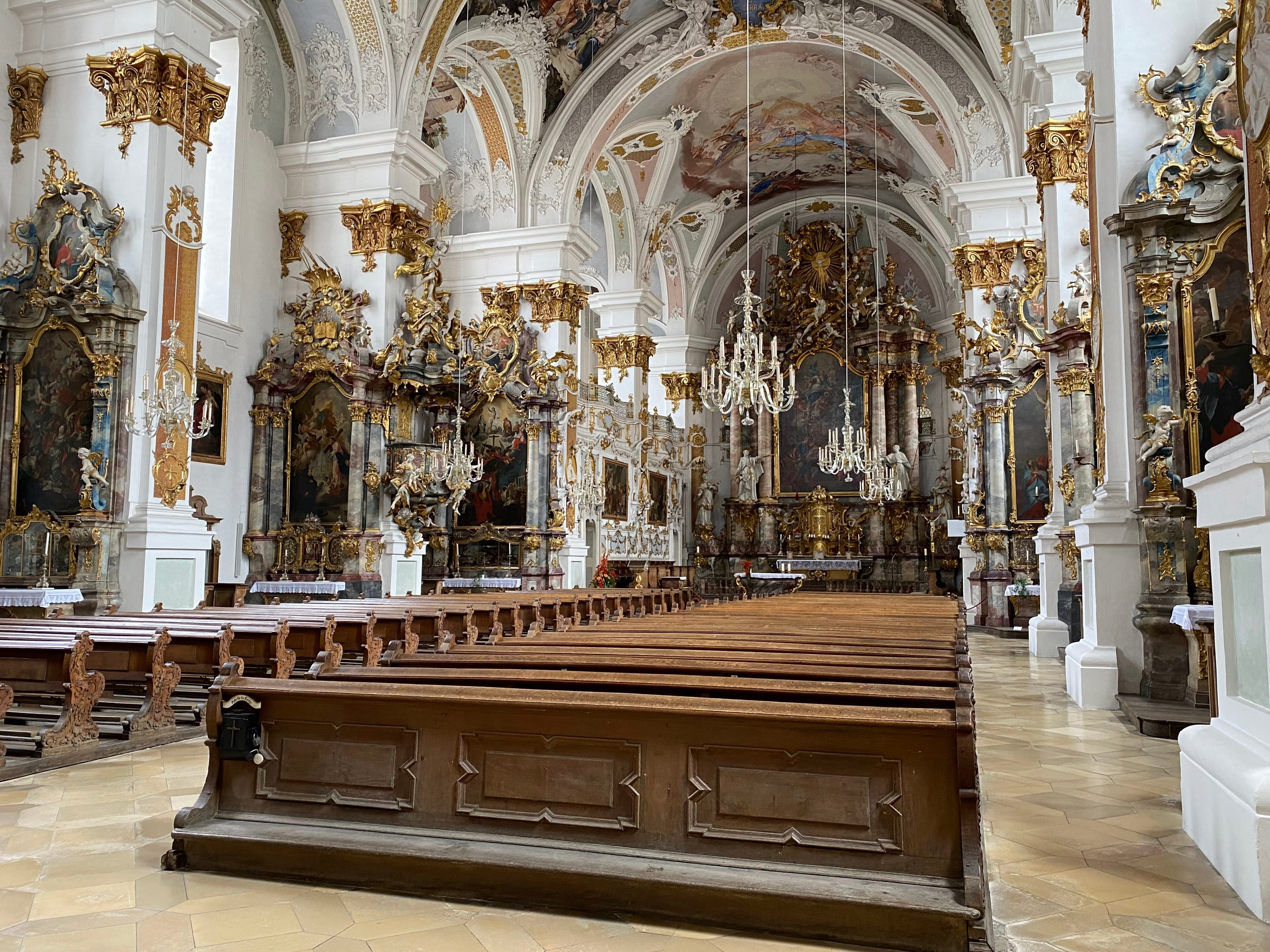
The Church of the Jesuit University of Dillingen (Donau)

== Local council ==
As of May 2024, the council is composed of the following parties:

Party	Seats
CSU	8
Alliance 90 / The Greens	2
Bürgergemeinschaft Hausen	2
Freie Wähler	2
Schretzheimer Liste	2
Wählergemeinschaft Steinheim	2
AfD	1
Allgemeine Wählerliste Donaualtheim	1
JU	1
SPD	1
Wählerschaft Fristingen	1
Wählervereinigung Kicklingen	1

== Notable people ==
- Heinrich Vogtherr (1490-1556), painter
- Max Joseph Oertel (1835-1897), university professor and pioneer of medical science

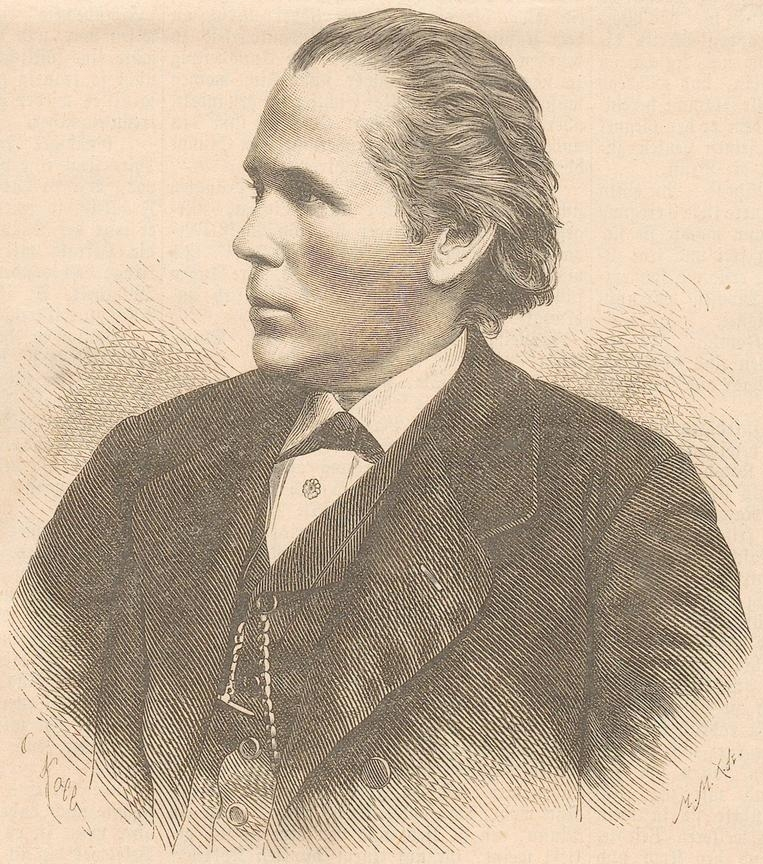
Max Joseph Oertel 1890

- Friedrich Rittelmeyer (1872-1938), Protestant theologian and co-founder of the Christian Community
- Georg Philipp Wörlen (1886-1954), painter and graphic artist

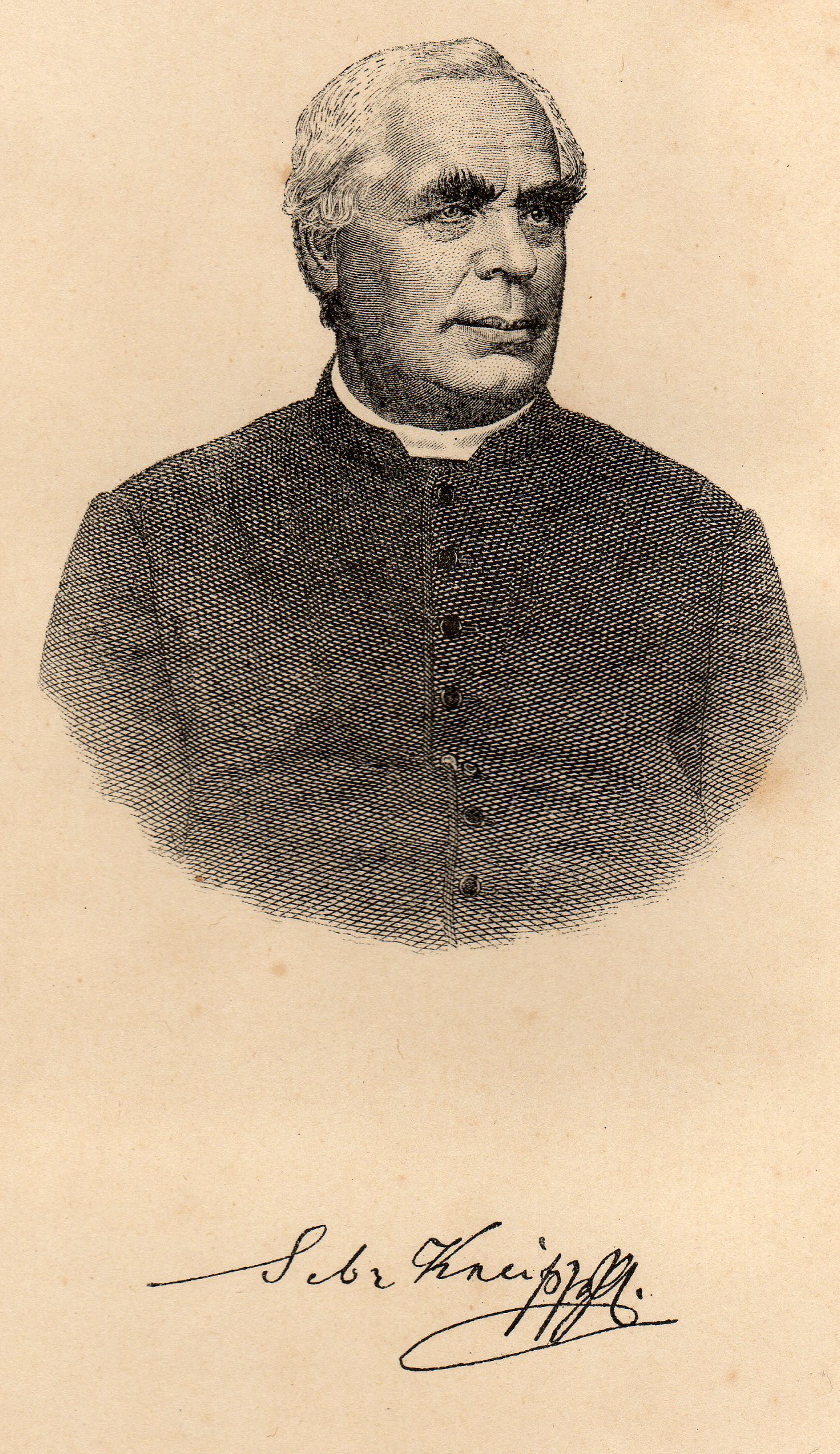
Sebastian Kneipp

- Matthias Klostermayr (1736-1771), leader of a gang of robbers, convicted in Dillingen and strangled, then smashed, beheaded and quartered.
- Johann Michael Sailer (1751-1832), a Catholic theologian, professor of ethics and pastoral theology in Dillingen 1821 Domkapitular and 1822 auxiliary bishop with right of succession, in 1829 Bishop of Regensburg
- Christoph von Schmid (1768-1854), Catholic theologian
- Michael Kitzelmann (1916-1942), Catholic, soldier, Nazi resistance
- Sebastian Kneipp (1821-1897), Catholic priest and hydrotherapist, began in 1848 his studies of theology in Dillingen.
- Heinz Piontek (1925-2003), writer
- Peter Felser (born 1969), politician

== See also ==
- Basilica of Sts. Peter and Paul, Dillingen
- Oberliezheim

== Twin towns ==
- Bondeno, Italy
- Brand-Erbisdorf, Germany
- (Republic of Ireland) Naas, Ireland
