= Ulrich cross =

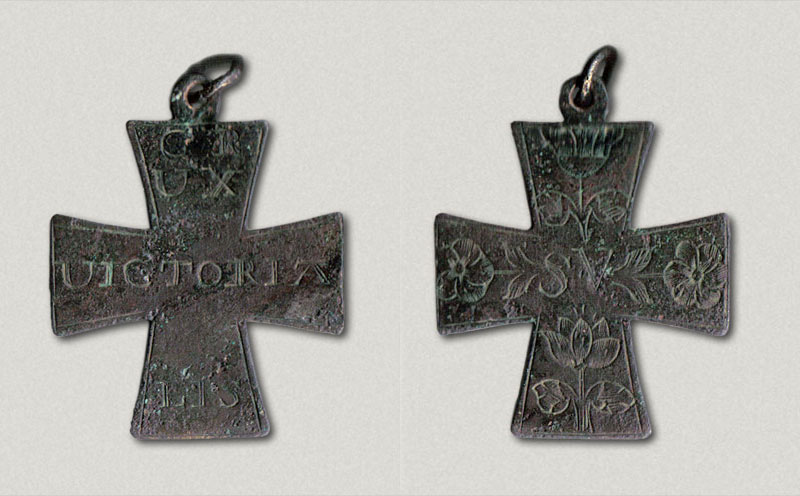
Early Ulrich cross of Class I-A

Ulrich crosses (German: Ulrichskreuze) are souvenir crosses originally given to pilgrims who visited the sepulchre of Saint Ulrich of Augsburg in the basilica that bears his name in Augsburg.

== Crux Victorialis ==
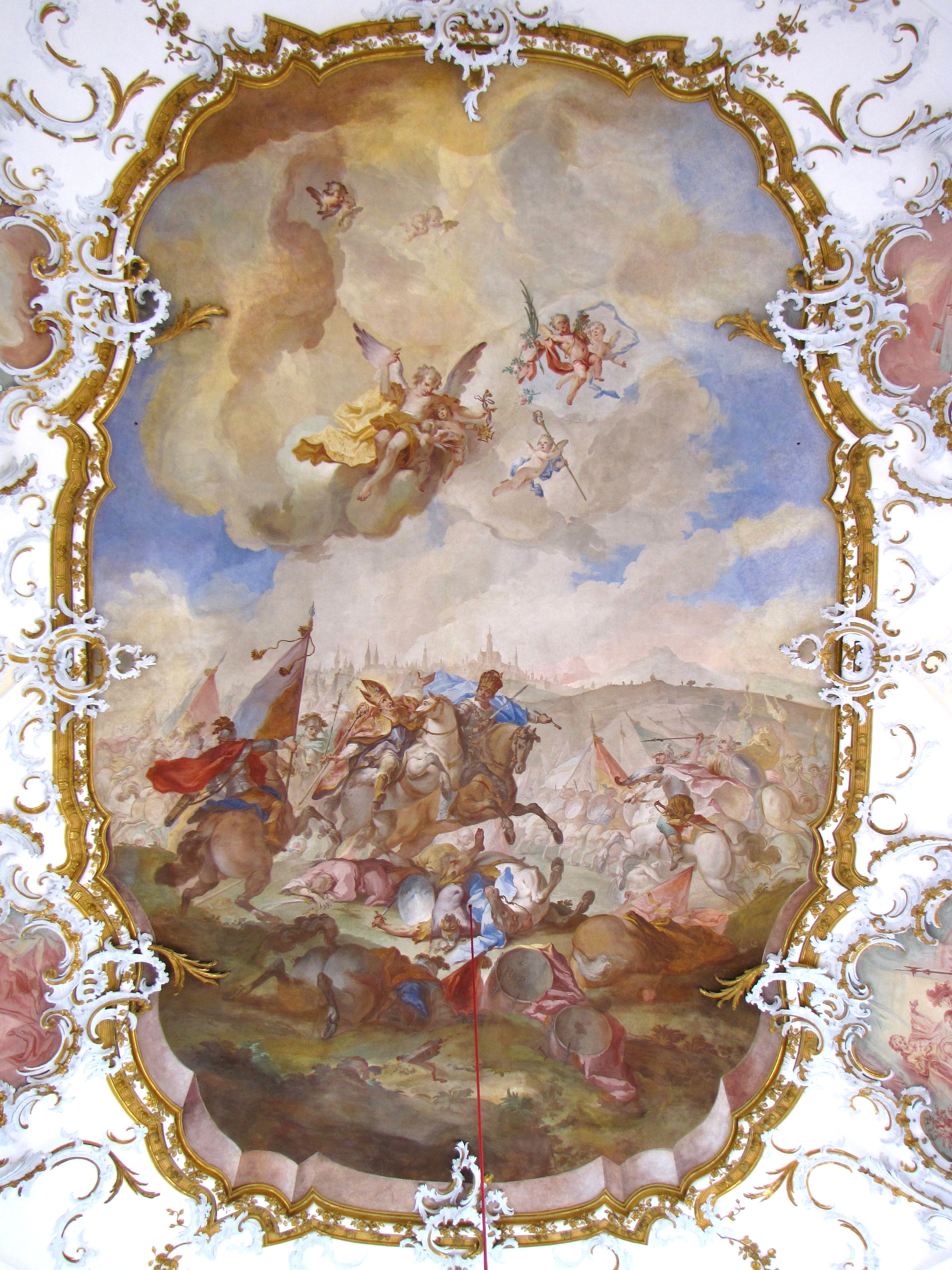
1744 fresco depicting the legend of Ulrich at the Lechfeld by Balthasar Riepp

The Ulrich crosses represented the relic of the True Cross also kept in the basilica. According to late medieval legend, Saint Ulrich was present at the Battle of the Lechfeld on 10 August 955. He was unarmed, carrying only a relic of the True Cross that had been given to him by an angel. In light of King Otto the Great's victory over the Hungarians, this relic became known as the Crux Victorialis ('cross of victory'). Historically, Ulrich was present, unarmed, with the defenders of Augsburg who went out to meet the invaders on 7 August. It is unlikely he was present at the Lechfeld, however.

Ulrich probably acquired his single piece of the True Cross on a trip to Rome. It is kept inside a reliquary created between 1280 and 1320. Originally designed to be worn in a pectoral cross, in 1494 it was placed within a cross-shaped Gothic case designed by goldsmith Georg Seld and his brother Nikolaus, commissioned by Abbot Johannes von Giltlingen. The story of Ulrich at the Lechfeld is depicted on the back of the case. Although once attached to a chain and worn around the neck by the abbots of Saint Ulrich and Saint Afra, it is nowadays attached to a stand.

== Souvenir crosses ==
The first souvenir crosses were made in the 17th century. They were produced by both stamping and casting. They came sometimes to be treated as talismans against mice and as such were buried in fields, cellars, etc. Most surviving examples come from Germany and Alsace–Lorraine, but some are found in museum collections further afield. The dimensions of a typical cross are about 5.5 centimetres (2.2 in) square.

Ulrich cross of Class IV

Joseph Friesenegger classifies the crosses into the following types:

- Class I depicts Saint Ulrich. Class I-A does not depict the Battle of the Lechfeld on the reverse while I-B does, usually containing reference to the Crux Victorialis on the obverse. Depictions of the battle are typical on the reverse in other classes as well.
- Class II depicts the city of Augsburg. Class II-B also depicts Saint Benedict orans.
- Class III have the talismanic character of amulets. Class III-A shows Saint Benedict between Saints Ulrich and Afra, while III-B drops the Augsburg saints. These may contain the initials of the Vade retro satana of Benedict or the symbol and letter sequence + Z + DIA + BIZ + SAB + Z + HGF + BFRS, a blessing attributed to either Patriarch Zacharias of Jerusalem or Pope Zacharias in which the letters stand for Psalms that speak of pestilence. Some crosses of this latter type were credited with saving lives during a plague outbreak at the Council of Trent in 1546.
- Class IV depicts Saint Digna alongside four early bishops of Augsburg whose relics had been unearthed in 1698 (Wicterp, Tosso, Nidker and Adalbero).
- Class V depicts the Virgin Mary (based on a 1570 image in the Schnecken Chapel).
- Class VI contains crosses that would otherwise belong in I-A or I-B but which were made for special occasions (i.e., baptisms, coronations, etc.).
- Class VII are late 18th-century rosary pendants that name Ulrich.
- Class VIII are those commissioned by Friesenegger himself between 1893 and 1911.

== Bibliography ==
- Friesenegger, Joseph M. (1932). "The Ulric Crosses". The Art Bulletin. 14 (1): 54–58. JSTOR 3050817. Foreword by Earl Baldwin Smith.
- Friesenegger, Joseph M. (1937). Die Ulrichskreuze (2nd ed.). Augsburg.
- Graham, Rose (1944). "An Ulrich Cross in the Guildhall Museum". Journal of the British Archaeological Association. Third Series. 9 (1): 30–32. doi:10.1080/00681288.1944.11894685.
