= Nidker =

Bishop of Augsburg from 816 to 830

Nidker of Augsburg
- Bishop of Augsburg
- Diocese: Augsburg
- In office: 816 – 830
- Predecessor: Hanto of Augsburg
- Successor: Udalmann of Augsburg

Personal details
- Died: 830
- Buried: Basilica of SS. Ulrich and Afra, Augsburg
- Denomination: Roman Catholic

Ulrich cross with Nidker, standing, on the left bar, where his name is spelled Nigarius

Nidker (or Nidgar) was the bishop of Augsburg from 816 until his death around 830.

Nidker succeeded Hanto as bishop in 816. On 31 August 822, he was a member of a Missus dominicus court held in Allershausen. At the same court, he was sued by Bishop Hitto of Freising over possession of the church at Kienberg. The case was decided in favour of Freising.

Nidker died around 830 and was buried in the church of Saints Ulrich and Afra. He was succeeded by Udalmann. He came to be recognised as a saint. In 1064, when the church was demolished and rebuilt, the bones of Nidker were found along with those of Saint Digna of Augsburg and two earlier bishops, Adalbero and Wicterp. After 1494, Nidker is depicted alongside Digna, Adalbero, Wicterp and Bishop Tosso on many of the Ulrich crosses that were purchased by pilgrims at the church.

== Bibliography ==
- Brown, Warren (2001). Unjust Seizure: Conflict, Interest, and Authority in an Early Medieval Society. Cornell University Press.
- Graham, Rose (1944). "An Ulrich Cross in the Guildhall Museum". Journal of the British Archaeological Association. Third Series. 9 (1): 30–32. doi:10.1080/00681288.1944.11894685.
- Hammer, Carl I. (2018). Huosiland: A Small Country in Carolingian Europe. Archaeopress.
- Krüger, Thomas Michael (2018). "Heilige Bischöfe Wikterp (gest. vor 772), Tozzo (reg. Um 772 – um 778) und Nidker (Nidgar) (reg. Um 816 – um 830)". In Thomas Groll; Walter Ansbacher (eds.). Augusta Sacra - Heilige, Selige und Glaubenszeugen des Bistums Augsburg. pp. 56–69.
- Tyler, J. Jeffery (1998). Lord of the Sacred City - The Episcopus Exclusus in Late Medieval and Early Modern Germany. Brill.

Catholic Church titles
| Preceded by Hanto | Bishop of Augsburg; 816 – 830 | Succeeded by Udalmann |
