= Conrad of Constance =

German bishop and saint

Saint Conrad of Constance
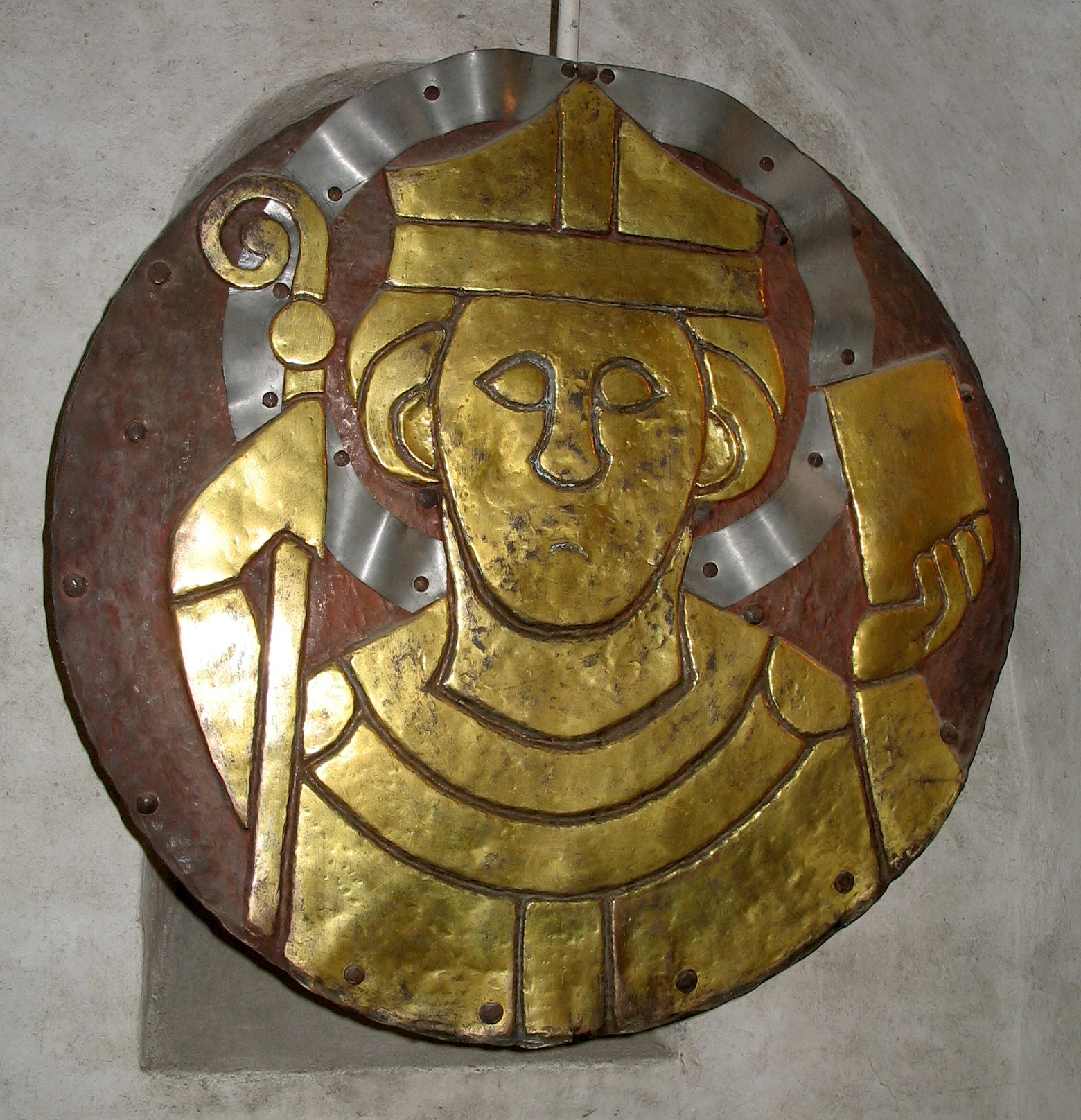
- Copper plate showing Saint Conrad. From the crypt of Cathedral of Konstanz.
- Born: c. 900
- Died: 26 November 975
- Venerated in: Eastern Orthodox Church; Roman Catholic Church
- Canonized: 1123, First Lateran Council by Pope Callixtus II
- Feast: 26 November
- Attributes: represented as a bishop holding a chalice with a spider in it or over it.

Conrad of Constance (German: Konrad von Konstanz; Latin: Conradus, Curtius; c. 900 – 26 November 975) was a German bishop and saint.

== Life ==
Conrad was a member of the powerful Welf family, son of Count Heinrich of Altdorf. After an education at the cathedral school in Constance, he became provost of Constance Cathedral and in 934 was made Bishop of Constance.

It is counted as one of his achievements that he avoided becoming enmeshed in the politics of the day and reserved his energies for his episcopal duties. He was nevertheless close to Emperor Otto I, whom he accompanied to Italy in 962. Conrad made three pilgrimages to Jerusalem as well as a number to Rome. He founded a number of churches on the episcopal estates and the hospital at Kreuzlingen, named after a portion of the True Cross which Conrad brought back from Jerusalem and presented to it.

== Veneration ==
His remembrance as a role model for courage was supported by Bishop Ulrich I of Dillingen, Bishop of Constance (1111–1127). The Vita of Conrad was written in about 1120 by Udalschalk, a monk of St. Ulrich's and St. Afra's Abbey, Augsburg, of which he later became abbot (1124 or 1127 to c. 1150 or 1151). Its late date doubtless accounts for its lack of content, notwithstanding which, Conrad was canonised at the First Lateran Council in 1123.

== Iconography ==
Saint Conrad is sometimes represented as a bishop holding a chalice with a spider in it or over it. This refers to a story that once when he was celebrating mass a spider fell into the chalice. Spiders were believed at that time to be deadly poisonous, but Conrad nevertheless drank the Blood of Christ, which had been transubstantiated from wine, with the spider in it, as a token of faith.

== See also ==
- Cultural depictions of spiders

== Sources ==
- Adriaan Breukelaar (1992). "Konrad von Konstanz". In Bautz, Traugott (ed.). Biographisch-Bibliographisches Kirchenlexikon (BBKL) (in German). Vol. 4. Herzberg: Bautz. cols. 416–417. ISBN 3-88309-038-7.
- St. Patrick's Church: Conrad of Constance
