= Annals of Vendôme =

Calendar for the years 813–851 with the annals in the margin

The Annals of Vendôme (Latin: Annales Vindocinenses) are a set of medieval annals covering events from 678 to 1347. They survive in a single manuscript copy (Oxford, Bodleian Library, Bodley 309 [8837], at fols. 111r–131v), the exemplar of which came from the Abbey of the Holy Trinity at Vendôme.

They are sometimes regarded as a continuation of the chronicle of Rainaud de Saint-Maurice, a canon, archdeacon and schoolmaster of the cathedral of Angers around 1040. It has been proposed that Abbot Geoffrey of Vendôme introduced the chronicle of Angers into his abbey and began their continuation. All the entries (events and obituaries) up to 1075 are written in the same hand and are so heavily reliant on the chronicle of Saint-Maurice as to be of little historical value. The continuations, extending down to the siege of Calais in 1347, are all made in contemporary hands and constitute an original and important source for local events. In the manuscript, the annals are preceded by a computus table and accompany a calendar that extends from 152 BC until AD 1421.

The annals take a special interest in the counts of Anjou. Much of their information may have come from the priory of the Blessed Saviour at L'Évière, a suburb of Angers. This priory was founded by Count Geoffrey Martel in 1047 and was subject to the abbey of Vendôme. In 1177, the monks fled from Count John I of Vendôme and took refuge at L'Évière.

Sometime before 1635, André Duchesne made a copy of the annals from 678 until 1257 in the library of Vendôme. This was published by Philippe Labbe in 1657. At some point the manuscript was acquired by Edward Bernard, who sold it to the Bodleian in 1698. In 1898, Rose Graham published all those entries from 881 to 1347 that had not been published by Labbe. The manuscript has thus been published in its entirety.

== Editions ==
- Rose Graham, ed. "The Annals of the Monastery of the Holy Trinity at Vendôme", The English Historical Review, 13, 52 (1898): 695–700.
- Louis Halphen, ed. "Annales Vindocinenses, et continuationes". Recueil d'annales angevines et vendomoises, pp. 50–79. Paris, 1903.
- Paul Marchegay and Émile Mabille, eds. "Chronicon Vindocinense seu de Aquaria", Chroniques des églises d'Anjou, pp. 153–77. Paris, 1869.
