= Otto Heinrich Fugger, Count of Kirchberg =

German count (1592–1644)

Otto Heinrich Fugger Count of Kirchberg
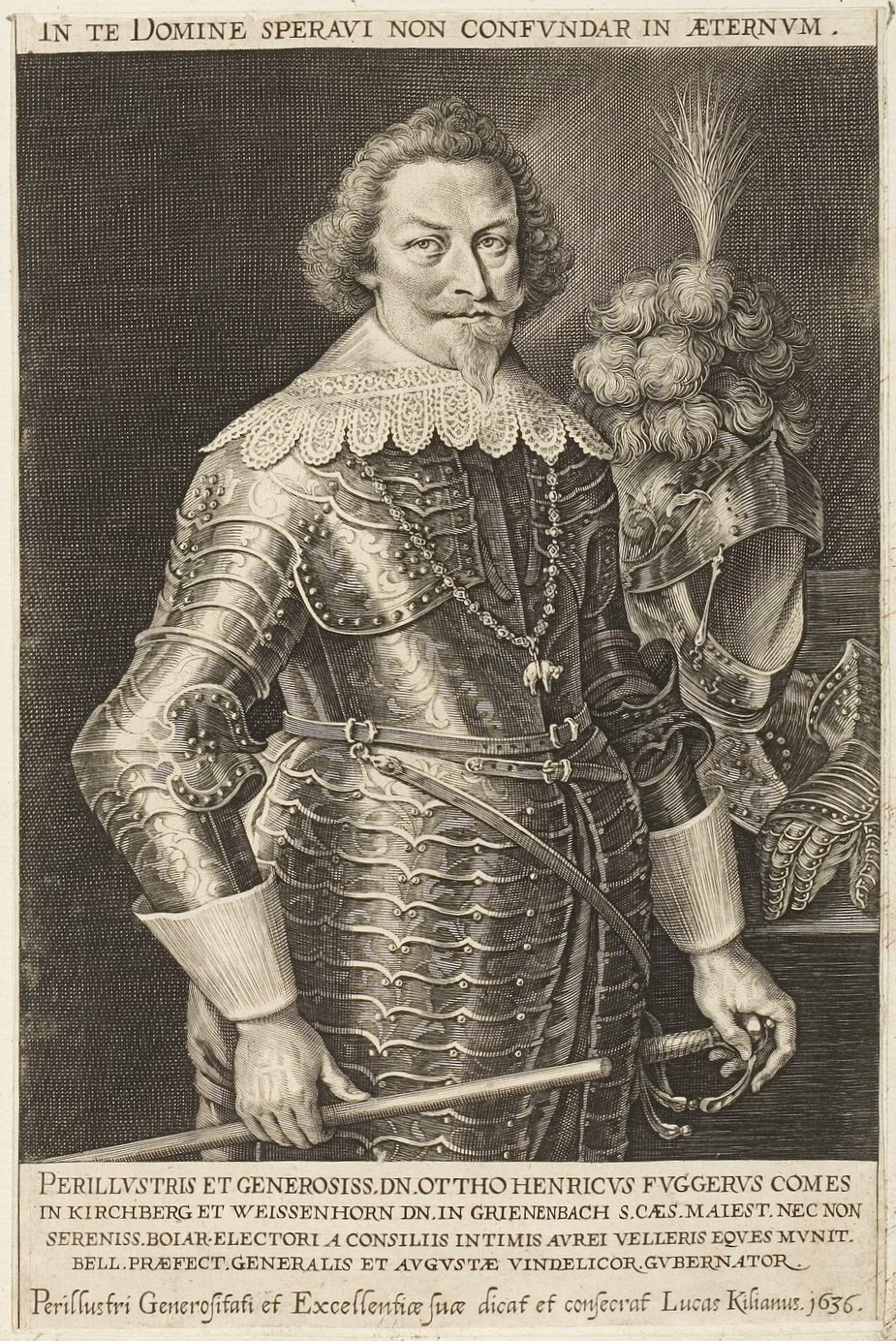
- Otto Heinrich Fugger, Count of Kirchberg
- Born: 12 January 1592
- Died: 12 October 1644 (aged 52); Free City of Augsburg, Holy Roman Empire
- Burial place: Basilica of St. Ulrich, Augsburg
- Military career
- Allegiance: Spain; Holy Roman Empire; Bavaria
- Branch: Imperial Army
- Service years: 1617–1644
- Rank: Feldzeugmeister
- Conflicts: Eighty Years' War: Siege of Breda (1624); War of the Mantuan Succession; Thirty Years' War: Battle of White Mountain (1620); Battle of the Alte Veste (1632); Siege of Regensburg (1634); Siege of Nördlingen (1634); Battle of Nördlingen (1634)

Otto Heinrich Fugger, Count of Kirchberg and Weissenhorn (12 January 1592 – 12 October 1644) was a German professional soldier in Imperial and Bavarian service during the Thirty Year's War. Born into the ennobled mercantile family Fugger, he chose a military career in which he became a Knight of the Golden Fleece and served as governor and military commander of Augsburg.

== Early life and ancestry ==
He was the son of Christoph Fugger von Glött († 1615) and his wife, Countess Maria of Schwarzenberg-Hohenlandsberg (1572-1622). Paternally, he was the grandson of Hans Fugger († 1598) and the great grandson of Augsburg's very wealthy international businessman and banker Anton Fugger (1493–1560). The 16th century Fugger's, descendants of a German businessmen family tracked down to the 14th century, were the principal bankers of the Habsburg dynasty, especially of Emperor Charles V (1500–1558).

== Marriage and issue ==
His childless first marriage was with Anna von Pappenheim (1584–1616), widowed von Rechberg, on 29 Oktober 1612. Two years after her death, he married a second time to Baroness Maria Elisabeth von Waldburg-Zeil on 10 September 1618. Together they had 18 children (10 sons and 8 daughters), including the imperial privy councillor Johann Otto Fugger (1631–1687) and the Reichshofrat and Bavarian Obersthofmeister Paul Fugger (1637–1701). His eldest son Bonaventura (1619–1693) inherited the title Count of Kirchberg and Weissenhorn and married Baroness Claudia von Mercy, the daughter of the Bavarian field marshal Franz von Mercy.

== Biography ==
Otto Heinrich studied at Ingolstadt and Perugia before starting a military career in 1617. Under Pedro de Toledo Osorio, the Spanish commander of Milan, he participated in the siege of Vercelli. At the outbreak of the Bohemian Revolt, Fugger recruited a regiment in Swabia as colonel. He fought under Count Bucquoy at the White Mountain, under Spinola at Breda and under Wallenstein in Lower Saxony. From 1629 to 1631, he accompanied the imperial troops supporting Spain in the War of the Mantuan Succession.

Changing into Bavarian service in the army of the Catholic League in 1631, he became Generalfeldwachtmeister and campaigned in Hesse against Landgrave William V of Hesse-Kassel from which he captured the Princely Abbey of Fulda. Count Tilly's defeat at Breitenfeld forced him to retreat from Hesse and to reinforce Tilly against the advance of the victorious Swedes. Promoted to Feldzeugmeister in 1632, he occupied Windsheim and Rothenburg ob der Tauber, and received an independent command in Swabia to defend Bavaria's western border. At the Battle of the Alte Veste, he supported Wallenstein with 6,000 men against the Swedes. The following year, Fugger fought in Alsace against Bernard of Saxe-Weimar under Tilly's successor, Johann von Aldringen.

For a short time, Fugger even became commander of the Catholic League forces after Aldringen's death at Landshut in June 1634. He participated in the sieges of Regensburg and Nördlingen but his command was given to Charles IV of Lorraine prior to the Battle of Nördlingen in September. Nevertheless, Fugger distinguished himself in the battle. For his service to the League and the Habsburgs, he was promoted to Knight of the Order of the Golden Fleece by the King of Spain and elevated to Count of the Empire.

In 1635, he was appointed to governor of Augsburg, where his rule aroused much discontent because he replaced the Protestant municipal council by Catholic councillors and enforced severe contributions on the citizens. After a complaint of the protestant citizens reached Emperor Ferdinand II in 1636, Fugger was dismissed as governor but retained military command of the city. He died on 12 October 1644 in Augsburg where he was buried in the Basilica of St. Ulrich.

== Sources ==
- Chisholm, Hugh, ed. (1911). "Fugger" . Encyclopædia Britannica. Vol. 11 (11th ed.). Cambridge University Press. pp. 287–288.
- Meyer, Christian; Landmann, Carl von (1878). "Fugger" . Allgemeine Deutsche Biographie (in German). Vol. 8. Leipzig: Duncker & Humblot. pp. 179–185.
- Pechtl, Andreas (2009). "Nochmals Grimmelshausens "tapferer General" Franz von Mercy. Anmerkungen und Ergänzungen zum Beitrag von Martin Ruch". Simpliciana (in German). XXXI. Frankfurt am Main: Peter Lang: 479–504.
- Zorn, Wolfgang (1961). "Fugger, Ottheinrich". Neue Deutsche Biographie (in German). Vol. 5. Berlin: Duncker & Humblot. p. 722. (full text online).
