= British Archaeological Association =

Organisation

The British Archaeological Association (BAA) was founded in 1843 and aims to inspire, support and disseminate high quality research in the fields of Western archaeology, art and architecture, primarily of the mediaeval period, through lectures, conferences, study days and publications.

The BAA was founded in December 1843 by Charles Roach Smith, Thomas Wright and Thomas Joseph Pettigrew, to encourage the recording, preservation, and publication of archaeological discoveries, and to lobby for government assistance for the collection of British antiquities. All three men were Fellows of the Society of Antiquaries of London but felt the older body was too aristocratic, too London-focused and lacked the campaigning vigour required. The naming of the new body was symbolic: British referred to the campaign for a museum of British Antiquities, Archaeological differentiated their field from older antiquarian methods and Association had reformist, even revolutionary, overtones. Smith became its first secretary and arranged the first six annual congresses. Although he remained one of the secretaries until 1851, he had effectively resigned the post in 1849.

One of the aims of the association was to promote dialogue between self-identified experts and local archaeologists, to be achieved through the organization of an annual congress, along the model of the French Congres Archaeologique or the annual meetings of the British Association for the Advancement of Science. The first meeting was held in Canterbury in 1844. The site, with its magnificent cathedral, had obvious appeal and was close to the seat of the association’s first president, Lord Albert Conyngham (1805-1860). The Canterbury Congress occasioned the dispute which led to a split and the formation of the Archæological Institute (AI). The public reason for the feud was the publication by Thomas Wright of The Archæological Album, or, Museum of National Antiquities (1845), a commercial publication from which Wright drew profit. This infuriated Oxford publisher John Henry Parker, who was to have been the publisher of the official proceedings. Behind the scenes, however, the dispute had other dimensions, both social (all the founders of the BAA were 'trade', the seceding members of the AI considered themselves to be socially superior) and religious (the Oxford Chronicle of 16 August 1845 suggested that the dispute had acquired Tractarian/anti-Tractarian overtones).

The nineteenth-century passion for archaeology meant that both the BAA and the AI (later the Royal Archaeological Institute) flourished, although the earlier society retained the reputation for enthusiasm rather than elegance. In 1905, however, the BAA had reached a low ebb. The congress, held in Bath, made no money, the journal was delayed and many members were in arrears. The custom had emerged of electing as president a dignitary from the locality in which the next Congress was to take place. In 1905, the mayor of Reading was elected, to preside over a Congress in the same town. However, by the time the Congress took place, local landowner and former High Sheriff of Berkshire, Charles Edward Keyser, had become president. Keyser remained president until his death in 1929.

From 1945 until 1951, Rose Graham, a religious historian, served as its first female president.

The annual conference was revived in 1975, with the first of the new series being held in Worcester. Since then, the association has held an annual conference at a centre of established importance in the mediaeval period, usually in the British Isles and occasionally in mainland Europe, collating the results of recent research on major cathedrals, minsters and abbeys and including visits to places of relevant interest. The conference proceedings are published as the British Archaeological Association Conference Transactions.

The association's annual publication is The Journal of the British Archaeological Association.

== Annual Congresses of the British Archaeological Association ==
- 1844. 1st Annual Congress at Canterbury. July 1844
- 1845. 2nd Annual Congress at Winchester. August 1845
- 1846. 3rd Annual Congress at Gloucester, August 1846
- 1847. 4th Annual Congress at Warwick.
- 1848. 5th Annual Congress at Worcester.
- 1849. 6th Annual Congress at Chester. 30 July-4 August 1849.
- 1850. 7th Annual Congress at Manchester and Lancaster.
- 1851. 8th Annual Congress at Derby.
- 1852. 9th Annual Congress at Newark.
- 1853. 10th Annual Congress at Rochester and Maidstone.
- 1854. 11th Annual Congress at Chepstow.
- 1855. 12th Annual Congress at Isle of Wight and Southampton. 20–25 August 1855.
- 1856. 13th Annual Congress at Bridgwater and Bath.
- 1857. 14th Annual Congress at Norwich
- 1858. 15th Annual Congress at Salisbury
- 1859. 16th Annual Congress at Newbury.
- 1860. 17th Annual Congress at Shrewsbury.
- 1861. 18th Annual Congress at Exeter.
- 1862. 19th Annual Congress at Leicester
- 1863. 20th Annual Congress at Leeds. October 1863
- 1864. 21st Annual Congress at Ipswich.
- 1865. 23rd Annual Congress at Durham. August 1865.
- 1866. 24th Annual Congress at Hastings
- 1867. 25th Annual Congress at Ludlow
- 1868. 26th Annual Congress at Cirencester, August 1868.
- 1869. 27th Annual Congress at St Albans.
- 1870. 28th Annual Congress at Hereford.
- 1871. 29th Annual Meeting at Weymouth. August 1871.
- 1872. 30th Annual Congress at Wolverhampton.
- 1873. 31st Annual Congress at Sheffield.
- 1874. 32nd Annual Congress at Bristol.
- 1875. 33rd Annual Congress at Evesham.
- 1876. 34th Annual Congress in Bodmin and Penzance.
- 1877. 35th Annual Congress at Llangollen.
- 1878. 36th Annual Congress at Wisbech. August 1878.
- 1879. 37th Annual Congress at Great Yarmouth and Norwich.
- 1880. 38th Annual Congress at Devizes.
- 1881. 39th Annual Congress at Great Malvern.
- 1882. 40th Annual Congress at Plymouth.
- 1883. 41st Annual Congress at Dover.
- 1884. 42nd Annual Congress at Tenby.
- 1885. 43rd Annual Congress at Brighton.
- 1886. 44th Annual Congress at Darlington and Bishop Auckland.
- 1887. 45th Annual Congress at Liverpool.
- 1888. 46th Annual Congress at Glasgow.
- 1889. 47th Annual Congress at Lincoln.
- 1891. 48th Annual Congress at Oxford. Jul 1891
- 1893. 49th Annual Congress at Cardiff.
- 1894. Annual Congress at Winchester.
- 1895. Annual Congress at Stoke-on-Trent.
- 1899. Annual Congress at Buxton.
- 1900. Annual Congress at Leicester
- 1901. Annual Congress at Newcastle upon Tyne.
- 1902. 59th Annual Congress at Westminster (Caxton Hall). September 1902. President was Colonel Clifford Probyn, Mayor of Westminster.
- 1903. Annual Congress at Sheffield.
- 1906. Annual Congress at Nottingham.
- 1912. Annual Congress at Gloucester.
- 1913. Annual Congress at Cambridge.
- 1917 Annual Congress at Brighton.
- 1932. Annual Congress at London.

NB An index to the first 30 volumes of the association's journal was published in 1875
