= Reginbald II (bishop of Speyer) =

Regimbald (Note: Also Regimbaut, Reginbald, Reginbaldus, Reginbold, or Reginhard.) (died 1039) was a Benedictine abbot of Lorsch Abbey, and bishop of Speyer, from 1032. He was previously at the abbey of Saints Ulrich and Afra and at Ebersberg Abbey.

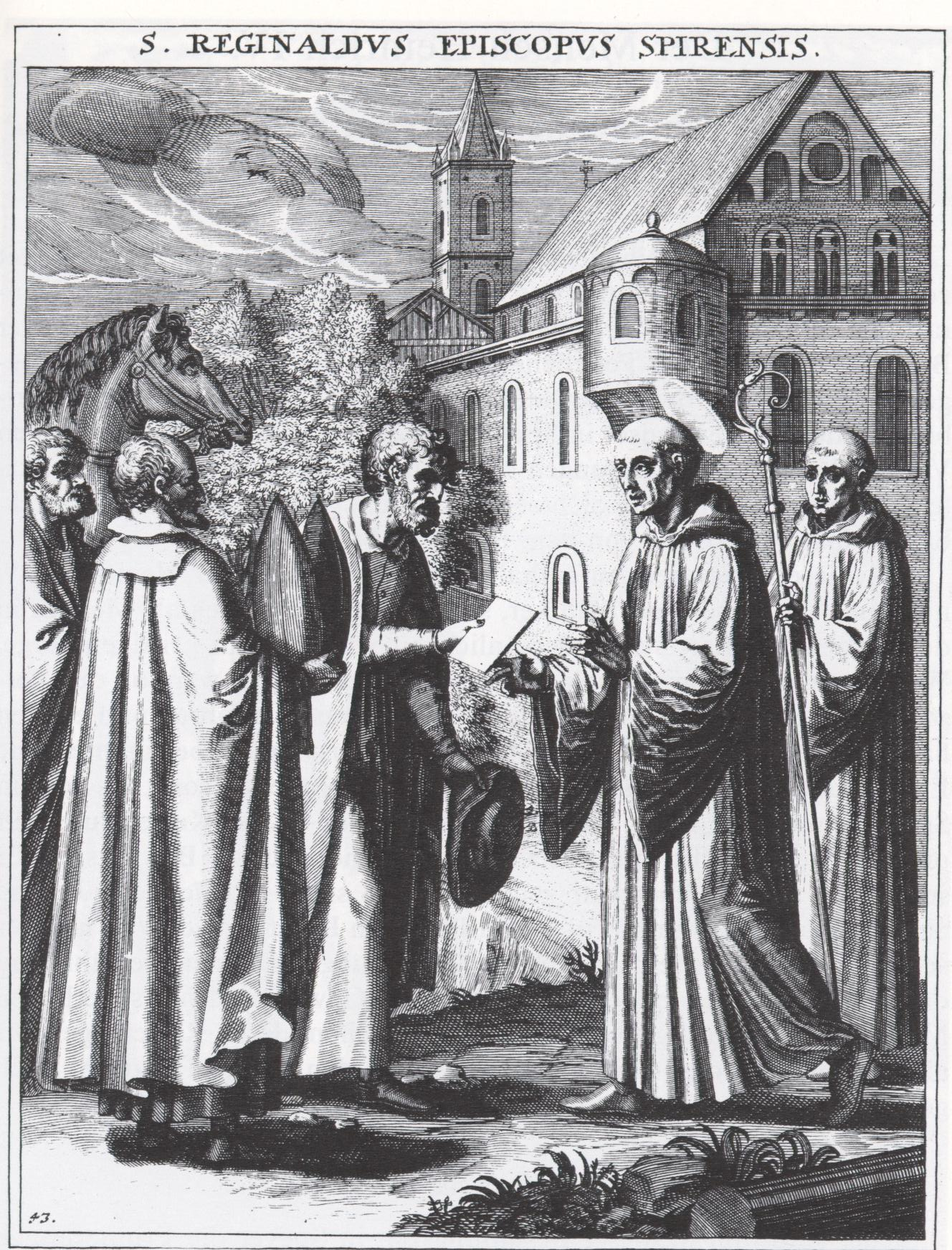
Regimbald, represented in 1615.

He is a Catholic and Orthodox saint, feast day 13 October.
