= Battle of Lechfeld =

Part of the Hungarian invasions of Europe, 955

Second Battle of Lechfeld
- Part of the Hungarian invasions of Europe
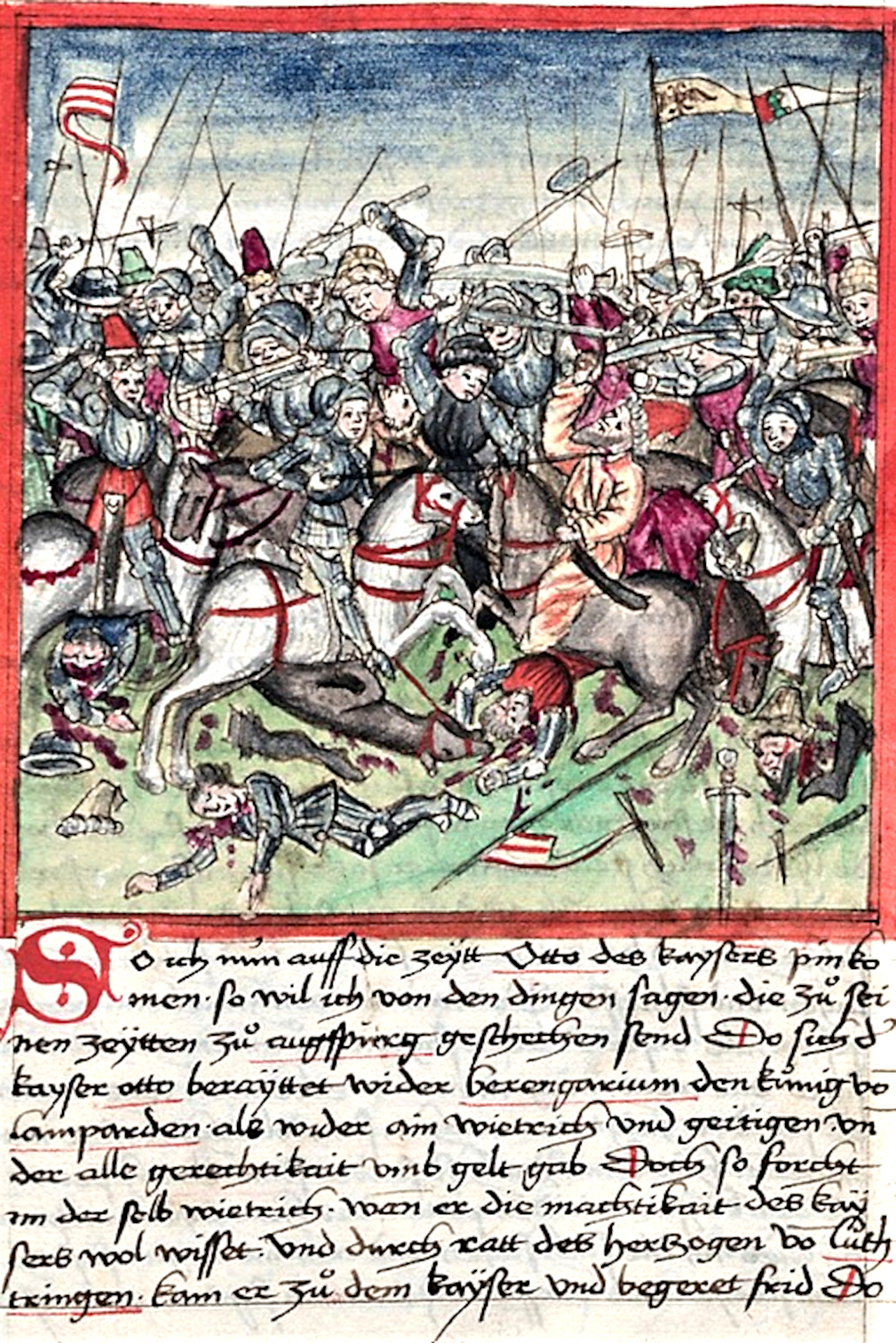
- The Battle of Lechfeld, from a 1457 illustration in Sigmund Meisterlin's codex of Nuremberg history
Date	10–12 August 955
Location	Lechfeld plain, near Augsburg, Bavaria 48.35°N 10.92°E
Result	German victory

Belligerents
Kingdom of Germany; Duchy of Saxony and Duchy of Thuringia; Duchy of Bavaria; Duchy of Swabia; Bohemia	Principality of Hungary

Commanders and leaders
King Otto I; Conrad, Duke of Lorraine †; Burchard III, Duke of Swabia; Boleslaus I, Duke of Bohemia	harka Bulcsú (executed); Lél (executed); Súr (executed); Taksony; Csaba

Strength
7,000–9,000 heavy cavalry and infantry; Garrison	8,000–10,000 horse archers; Infantry; Siege engines

Casualties and losses
Heavy	Majority killed

The Battle of Lechfeld, also known as the Second Battle of Lechfeld, was a series of military engagements over the course of three days from 10 to 12 August 955 in which the Kingdom of Germany, led by King Otto I the Great, defeated the Hungarian army led by Harka Bulcsú and the chieftains Lél and Súr. With the German victory, further major invasions by the Magyars into Western Europe were ended.

The Hungarians invaded the Duchy of Bavaria in late June or early July 955 with 8,000–10,000 horse archers, infantry, and siege engines, intending to draw the main German army, under Otto I, into battle in the open field and destroy it. The Hungarians laid siege to Augsburg on the river Lech. Otto I advanced to relieve the city with an army of 8,000 heavy cavalry and infantry, divided into eight legions.

As Otto I approached Augsburg on 10 August, a Hungarian surprise attack destroyed the Duchy of Bohemia rearguard legion. The Hungarian force stopped to plunder the German camp and Conrad, Duke of Lorraine led a counter-attack with heavy cavalry, dispersing the Hungarians. Otto I then brought his army into battle against the main Hungarian army that barred his way to Augsburg. The German heavy cavalry defeated the lightly armed and armored Hungarians in close combat, but the latter retreated in good order. Otto I did not pursue, returning to Augsburg for the night and sending out messengers to order all local German forces to hold the river crossings in Eastern Bavaria and so prevent the Hungarians from returning to their homeland. On 11 and 12 August, the Hungarian defeat was transformed into disaster, as heavy rainfall and flooding slowed the retreating Hungarians and allowed German troops to hunt them down and kill all, save the Hungarian leaders, who were captured, taken to Augsburg, and hanged.

The German victory preserved the Kingdom of Germany and ended nomad incursions into Western Europe. Otto I was proclaimed emperor and father of the fatherland by his army after the victory, and went on to be crowned Holy Roman Emperor in 962 largely on the basis of his strengthened position after the Battle of Lechfeld.

== Historical sources ==
The most important source is a monograph commissioned by Ulrich of Augsburg, which describes the series of actions from the German point of view. Another source is the chronicler Widukind of Corvey, who provides some important details.

== Background ==
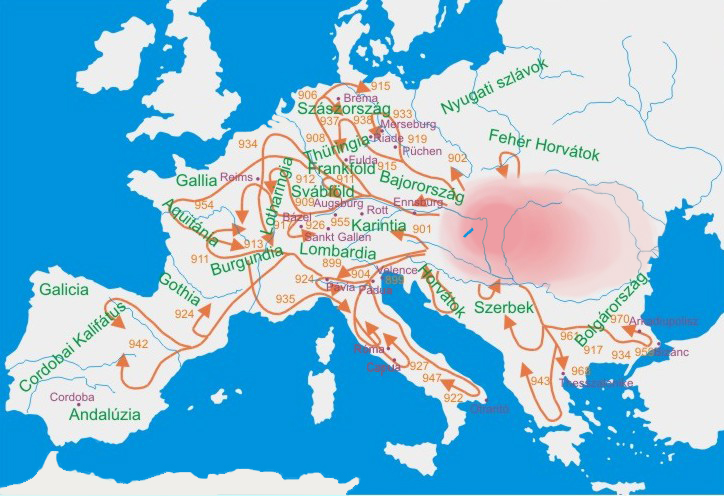
Hungarian raids across Europe in the 10th century

In 947, Berthold, Duke of Bavaria, a competent military leader, died and was succeeded by Henry I, brother of King Otto I. Aventinus stated that the Hungarians invaded Bavaria for this reason, but they weren't able to penetrate deep into East Francia. In the following years, the Germans started to threaten Transdanubia, with border clashes erupting along the Enns River. According to Hrotsvitha, Henry brought back much booty and prisoners from the Avars due to these. In 952, Otto put Italy under the protection of the Bavarian army, and westward invasions by the Magyars stopped temporarily. However, 953 saw rebellion in Francia under the leadership of the king's son Liudolf, Duke of Swabia, and son-in-law Conrad, Duke of Lorraine, mainly because of the occupation of Italy. In 954, these men called in the Hungarians, who then plundered the Rhineland and devastated France. The warriors returned from this successful adventure safely through Burgundy and Northern Italy.

The year 955 started badly for King Otto. Despite his best efforts, the archbishop of Salzburg joined the enemy. Harold was blinded and exiled to Tyrol, while his wealth was taken by Henry's vassals, but this upset many more Bavarian counts, who took up arms against the king. In spite of the growing of the resistance, Otto gained a shining victory at Mühldorf, proceeding to lay siege to Regensburg. Much of the city had already burned down, however its defenders long endured bombardment by Otto's siege engines before surrendering due to hunger, as no relief arrived. The internal situation hardly improved after Otto's defeat of the rebellion, as the nephews of Prince Hermann of Saxony frequently raided the duchy, allying with Polabian principalities. In early July Otto received Hungarian legates, who claimed to come in peace, but who the Germans suspected were actually assessing the outcome of the rebellion. After a few days, he let them go with some small gifts.

Soon, couriers from Otto I's brother Henry I, Duke of Bavaria, arrived to inform Otto I in Magdeburg of a Hungarian invasion. According to Prince-Bishop Ulrich, "they devastated the land of Noricum from the Danube to the Black Forest, which goes to the mountainous regions". According to Widukind, "he (Otto) started the march against the enemy like he wouldn't get tired in the previous war, only taking some of the Saxons by him, as the Slavic war threatened them". Saxony was distant from Augsburg and its environs, and considerable time would have elapsed waiting for Saxons' arrival. Ulm was chosen as the place to gather the anti-Hungarian forces. The battle took place six weeks after the first report of an invasion, and historian Hans Delbrück asserts that they could not have possibly made the march in time.

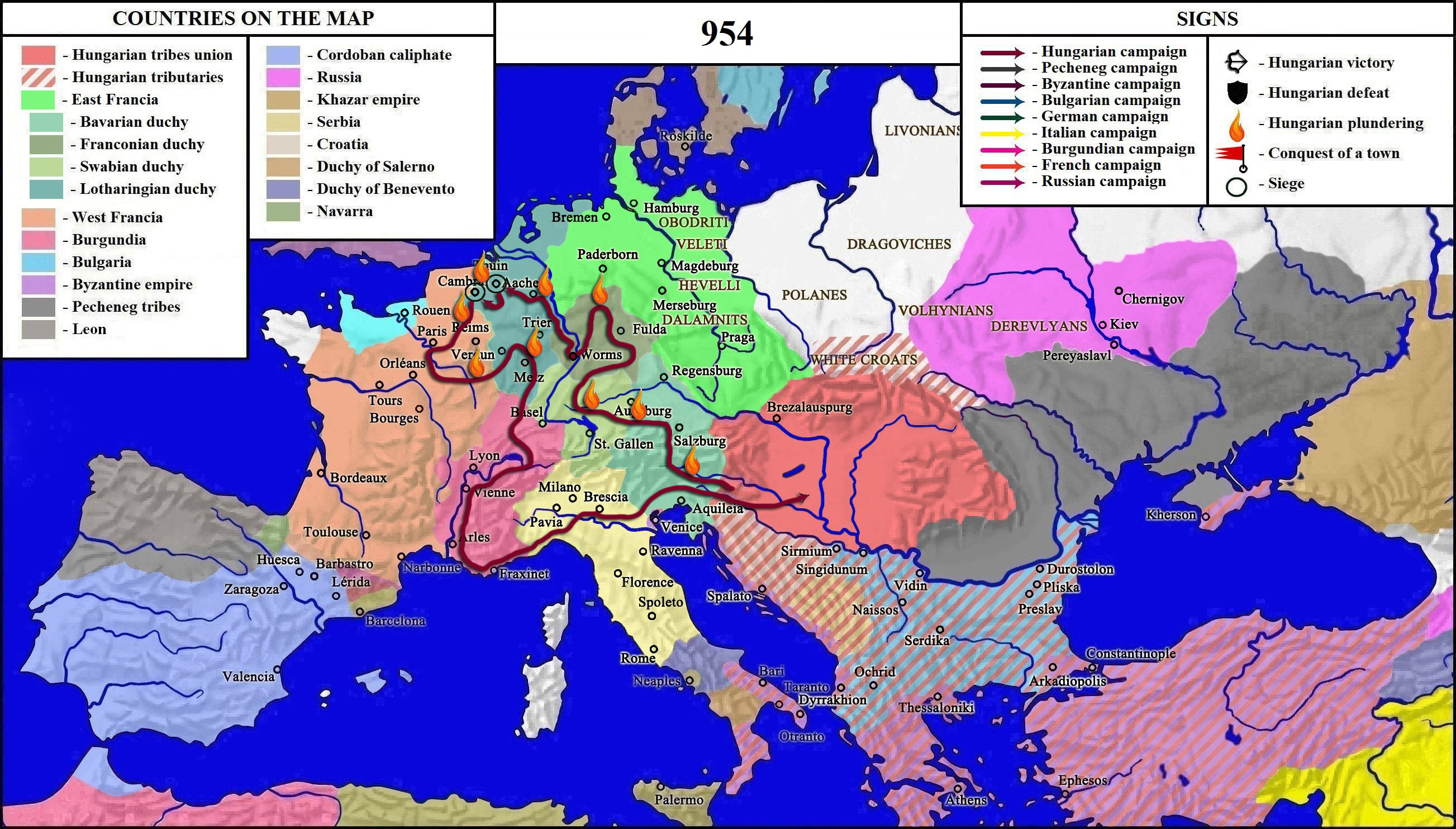
The Hungarian campaign in Europe of 954

The King ordered his troops to concentrate on the Danube, in the vicinity of Neuburg and Ingolstadt. He did this to march on the Hungarian line of communications and catch them in their rear while they were raiding northeast of Augsburg. It was also a central point of concentration for all the contingents that were assembling. Strategically, therefore, this was the best location for Otto I to concentrate his forces before making the final descent upon the Hungarians.

There were other troops that had an influence on the course of the battle. On previous occasions, in 932 and 954 for example, there had been Hungarian incursions that had invaded the German lands to the south of the Danube, and then retreated back to their native country via Lotharingia, to the West Frankish Kingdom and finally, through Italy. That is to say, a wide sweeping U-turn that initially started westward, then progressed to the south, and then finally to the east back to their homeland; and thus escaping retribution in German territory. The King was aware of the escape of these Hungarians on the above-mentioned occasions, and was determined to trap them. He therefore ordered his brother, Archbishop Bruno, to keep the Lotharingian forces in Lotharingia. With a powerful force of knights pressing them from the west, and an equally strong force of knights chasing them from the east, the Hungarians would be unable to escape.

Located south of Augsburg, the Lechfeld is the flood plain that lies along the river Lech. The battle appears as the second Battle of Augsburg in Hungarian historiography. The first Battle of Lechfeld happened in the same area forty-five years earlier.

== Prelude ==
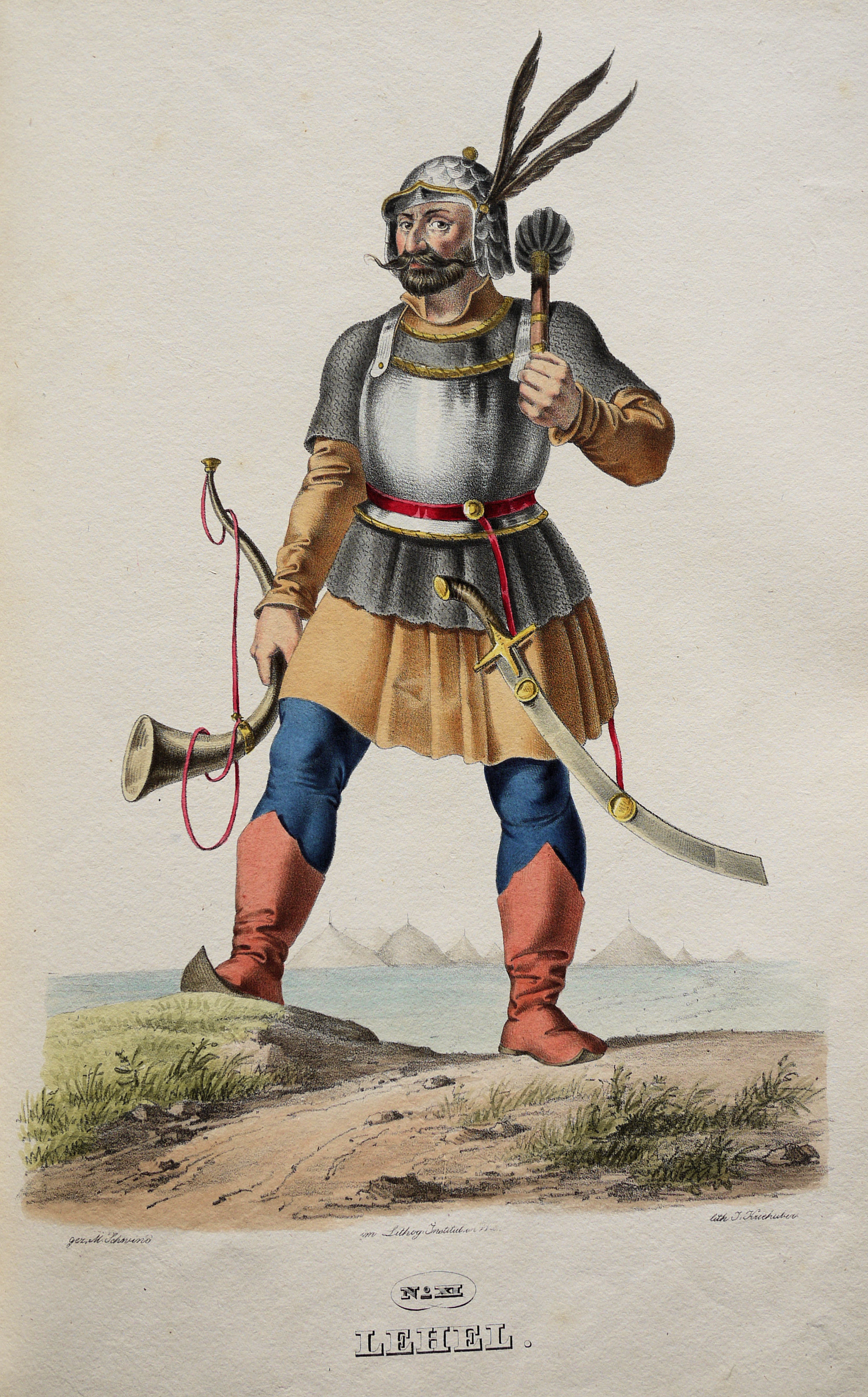
The Hungarian commander Lél. Lithograph by Josef Kriehuber, 1828.

Gerhard writes that the Hungarian forces advanced across the Lech to the river Iller and ravaged the lands in between. They then withdrew from the Iller and placed Augsburg, a border city of Swabia, under siege. Augsburg had been heavily damaged during a rebellion against Otto I in 954. The city was defended by Bishop Ulrich. He ordered his contingent of soldiers not to fight the Hungarians in the open, but to reinforce the main south gate of the fortress instead. He motivated them with the 23rd Psalm ("Yea, though I walk through the valley of the shadow of death"). While this defense was going on, the King was raising an army to march south. Simon of Kéza mentions that the Hungarians harassed Augsburg with attacks all day and night. That would seem to indicate that before the real siege they wished to take the city by sudden onslaughts.

After it had become apparent that this tactic wouldn't work, a major action took place on 8 August at the eastern gate, into which the Magyars tried to storm in large numbers, suspecting that it would be more weakly defended because of its limited accessibility. Ulrich led his professional milites (knights, soldiers) out into the field to engage the enemy in close combat. Ulrich writes of himself that he was unarmed, wearing only a stola while mounted on a warhorse, and all the arrows and stones bypassed him. According to him, the Hungarians could have entered the gates at any time; however, they lost their commander during the attack, and withdrew to their camp, taking the body. At first the defenders thought that the Hungarians were victorious and resuming the siege, only to realize that they were going back to the other side of the Lech.

During the night, the defenders took positions in all the towers of the city, and the Hungarians completely surrounded it with siege engines and infantry, who were driven forward by the whips of the Hungarian leaders. Next day, when the fights had scarcely started, they were informed by the traitor Berchtold of Risinesburg that Otto I had deployed his troops nearby. The siege was suspended, and the Hungarian leaders withdrew to hold a war council. As the Hungarians departed, Count Dietpald of Dillingen used the opportunity to lead soldiers to Otto I's camp during the night.

== Opposing forces ==
According to Widukind, Otto I had at his disposal eight legiones (divisions) that included three from Bavaria, two from Swabia, one from Franconia under Duke Conrad and one well-trained legion from Bohemia, under a prince of an unknown name, son of Boleslaus I. The eighth division, commanded by Otto I, and slightly larger than the others, included Saxons, Thuringians, and the King's personal guard, the legio regia. The King's contingent consisted of hand-picked troops. A late Roman legion had 1,000 men, so Otto I's army may have numbered 7,000–9,000 troops. (Note: Beeler gives no figures for the Magyars.) Augsburg was defended by professional milites (soldiers).

The Hungarians, also known as the Magyars, had a very different structure and fighting style than the Ottonian military. The Magyars preferred fighting at a distance with mounted archers over fighting in close combat with melee weapons, furthermore, the Magyars wore much lighter armor than Otto I's men. While there is some debate as to the number of mounted archers included in the Magyar forces, historians believe there was anywhere between 8,000 and 10,000 mounted archers. While this fighting style was effective, especially during raids against small villages and small military forces, historians have pointed out some weaknesses. One such weakness is the difficulty that came with raising horses that were suited for battle. Not only do horses require a large area to graze, but training them to be comfortable in battle takes a significant amount of time. This weakness was the biggest factor that limited the number of mounted archers available for the Hungarians. Another weakness is the fact that the bows used by the Magyars proved ineffective during inclement weather like rain. Without the ability to play to their strength, the Magyars would be forced to rely on melee combat, which was another weakness for them.

== Battle ==
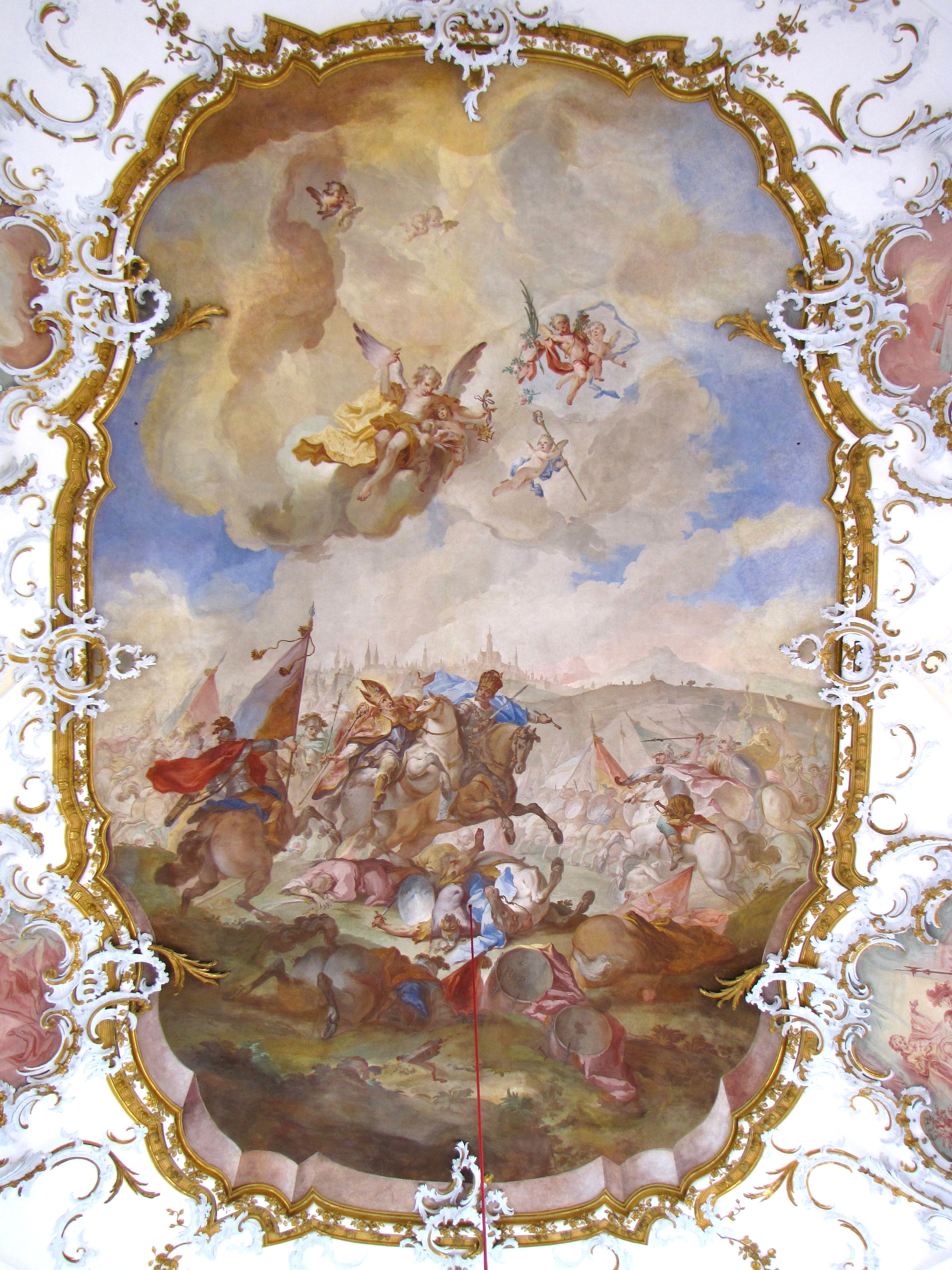
The Battle of Lechfeld, a 1744 fresco by Balthasar Riepp

On 9 August, the German scouts reported that the Hungarian army was in the vicinity. Otto I deployed his army for battle the next day. It is likely that Otto and Ulrich had communicated in the previous days, and informing the king that the city needed a relief force quickly. He departed from Ulm within seven days at most. The order of march of the German army was as follows: the three Bavarian contingents, the Frankish contingent under Duke Conrad, the royal unit (the center), the two contingents of Swabians and the Bohemian contingent guarding the supply train in the rear. The Bavarians were placed at the head of column, according to Delbrück, because they were marching through Bavarian territory and they therefore knew the territory best. All of these were mounted. They could achieve a maximum distance of 25 kilometers per day. The German army marched through woodland that protected them from the Hungarian arrow-storm, but also made it more difficult to see the Hungarian movements.

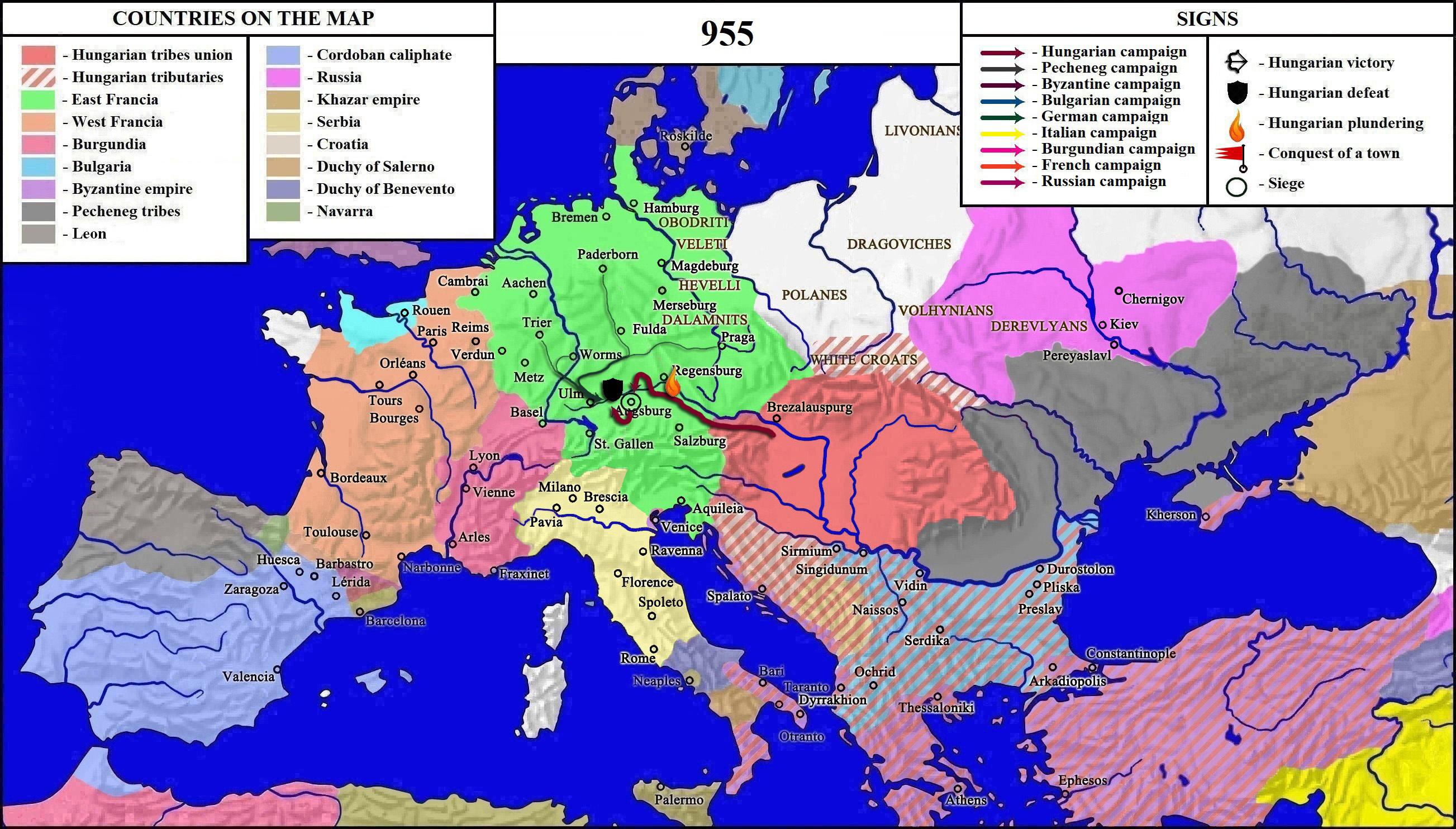
The Hungarian campaign in the German kingdom from 955

According to the chronicler Widukind of Corvey, Otto I "pitched his camp in the territory of the city of Augsburg and joined there the forces of Henry I, Duke of Bavaria, who was himself lying mortally ill nearby, and by Duke Conrad with a large following of Franconian knights. Conrad's unexpected arrival encouraged the warriors so much that they wished to attack the enemy immediately." The arrival of Conrad, the exiled Duke of Lotharingia (Lorraine) and Otto I's son-in-law, was particularly heartening because he had recently thrown in his lot with the Magyars, but now returned to fight under Otto I; in the ensuing battle he lost his life. A legion of Swabians was commanded by Burchard III, Duke of Swabia, who had married Otto I's niece Hedwig. Also among those fighting under Otto I was Boleslaus I, Duke of Bohemia. Otto I himself led the legio regia, stronger than any of the others in both numbers and quality.

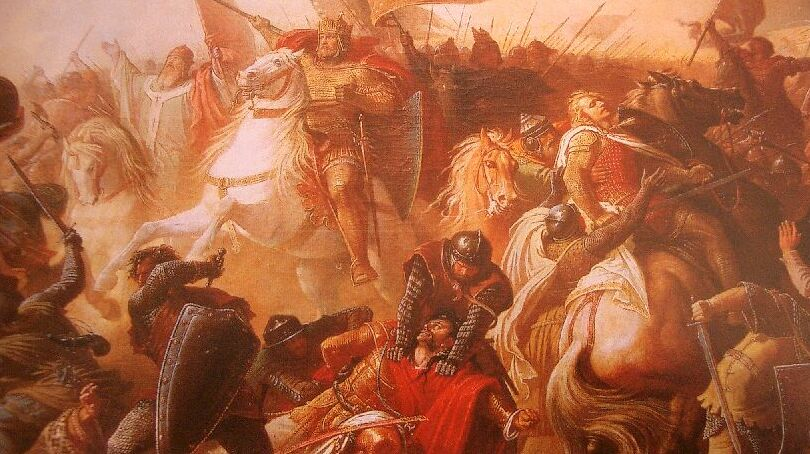
The Hungarian Battle of Lechfeld 955, an 1860 painting by Michael Echter

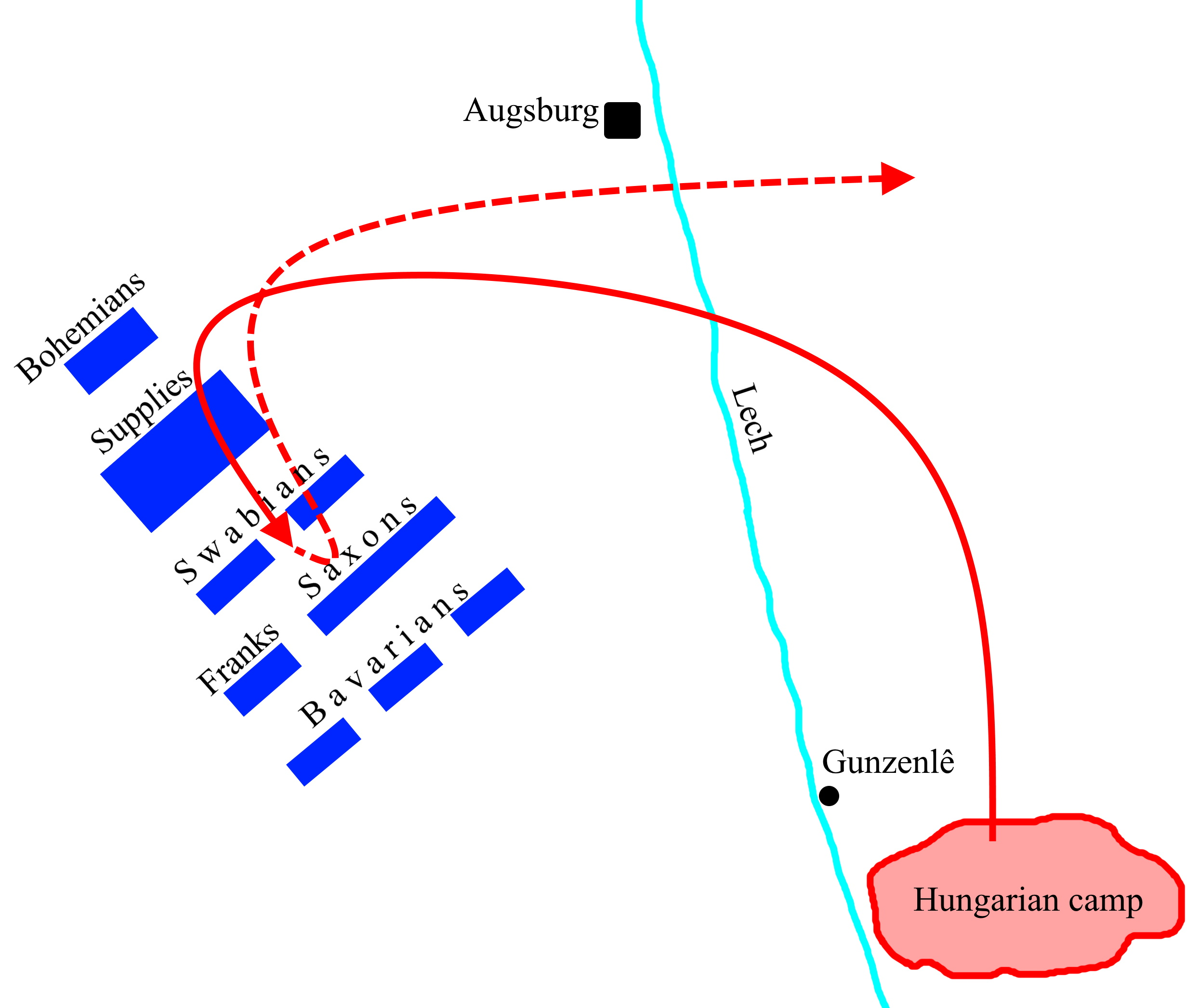
Map of the battle

The main Hungarian army blocked Otto I's way to Augsburg. A contingent of Hungarian horse-archers crossed the river west of Augsburg and immediately attacked the Bohemian legion from the flank. The Bohemians were routed and the two Swabian legions were badly damaged. The Hungarians stopped to plunder the German baggage train and Duke Conrad the Red used the opportunity to attack the vulnerable Hungarians and shatter them. Conrad returned to Otto I with captured Hungarian banners. Conrad's victory prevented the German army from being encircled.

Otto I rallied his men with a speech in which he claimed the Germans had better weapons than the Hungarians. Otto I then led the German army into battle with the main Hungarian force, defeating them. How the main Ottonian military defeated the Hungarians, however, is somewhat unclear. This is because Widukind's account of the battle is remarkably short and lacking in detail, which is surprising considering the significance of the battle. This has left some historians to speculate how the battle played out, based on the strategies outlined in Vegetius's Epitome of Military Science, which heavily influenced Ottonian strategy. According to these historians, while the infantry approached the center of the Magyar formation, Conrad's cavalry, posted on the left wing and protected on its flank from nearby cliffs, would stay out of range of the Hungarian archers but would also attempt to draw them more to their right. Meanwhile the royal legion, under Otto I's personal leadership, engaged the enemy from the right. Although the King's forces suffered losses from the archers, this gave the royal legion the opportunity to directly assault the Magyars in close combat, which was not the Magyar's area of strength. Conrad's forces would then wheel in from Otto I's left wing, putting the Hungarians in danger of being enveloped. Seeing the day going against them, the Hungarians retreated in ordered formations across the Lech to the east. Otto I's army pursued, killing every captured Hungarian. The Germans took the Hungarian camp, liberating prisoners and reclaiming booty.

However, Otto I wisely and for several reasons did not chase the Magyars much longer that day. Although the Hungarians suffered heavy losses, so did the king's forces. Three legions, in the rear of the relief column, had been decimated. Furthermore, because of their heavy equipment, Otto I's men were no doubt more affected by the stifling heat than their lightly armored opponents. Simply put, the King and his men were in no position to pursue and destroy the Magyars that day, leaving the initial battle a draw. The Magyars were also known to pull off feigned retreats, when they would lure their opponents into more advantageous positions, like open fields, then they would turn and defeat them, a notable example having occurred in 910 against East Frankish forces. This time the King instead opted to spend the night after the battle in Augsburg. On 11 August he specifically issued the order that all river crossings were to be held. This was done so that as many of the Hungarians as possible, and specifically their leaders, could be captured and killed. This strategy proved successful, as Duke Henry of Bavaria captured a number of their leaders and killed them. Some Hungarians tried to flee across an unknown river but were swept away by the current. Some sought refuge in nearby villages. The destruction of the Hungarian army continued on 12 August, when heavy rainfall and flooding allowing the German troops, operating from nearby fortifications, to kill almost all the fleeing Hungarian soldiers. The majority of these fortifications had been built and fortified during the reign of Otto I's father, Henry I of Saxony, as part of his defense-in-depth strategy against enemy invaders. If these had not been in place, it is very likely that the Hungarians could have completed an orderly retreat once the floodwaters had receded and the Battle of Lechfeld would have remained a draw.

The captured Magyars were either executed or sent back to their ruling prince, Taksony, missing their ears and noses. The Hungarian leaders Lél, Bulcsú and Súr were executed after the battle. Duke Conrad was also killed, after he loosened his mail armour in the summer heat and an arrow struck his throat.

== Aftermath ==
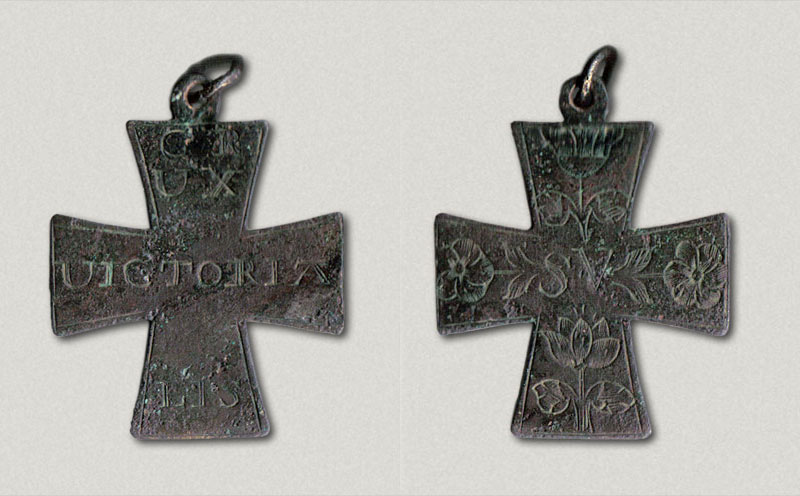
An Ulrich cross (Crux Victorialis Sancti Udalrici) c. 1600

Upon destruction of the Hungarian forces, the German army proclaimed Otto I father of the fatherland and emperor. In 962, on the strength of this, Otto I went to Rome and had himself crowned Holy Roman Emperor by Pope John XII. Historian Pierre Riché writes that Otto I was regarded by many thereafter as a "new Charlemagne", which also led to him being called "Otto the Great."

The Hungarian leaders Bulcsú, Lehel and Súr were taken to Regensburg and hanged with many other Hungarians.

The German annihilation of the Hungarian army definitively ended the attacks of Magyars against Western Europe. One of Otto's allies, the bishop of Cremona, claimed that the victory at Lechfeld left the Hungarians so cowed that they would not "dare to mutter." The Hungarian historian Gyula Kristó calls it a "catastrophic defeat". (Note: As Kristó and Makk write, "One may ask why the Hungarians abruptly ended their century old-tradition of raiding western Europe after that battle if it was insignificant.") Following the tactical disaster, the Hungarians reached the end of almost a century as Europe's dominant military. Moreover, after 955, the Hungarians completely ceased all campaigns westwards. In addition, Otto I did not launch any further military campaigns against them; their leader Fajsz was dethroned following their defeat and succeeded as Grand Prince of the Hungarians by Taksony.

=== Analysis ===
This battle has been viewed as a symbolic victory for the knightly cavalry, who would define European warfare in the High Middle Ages, over the nomadic light cavalry that characterized warfare during the Early Middle Ages in Central and Eastern Europe.

Paul K. Davis writes, the "Magyar defeat ended more than 90 years of their pillaging western Europe and convinced survivors to settle down, creating the basis for the state of Hungary."

== In popular culture ==
The battle was dramatized in season 1, episode 1 of the German documentary series, Die Deutschen, titled "Otto und das Reich" ("Otto and the Empire").
