= Udalscalcus =

Udalschalk
- Abbot
- Appointed: 1125
- In office: 1125 – c. 1150
- Predecessor: Wollemar
- Successor: Hezilo

Personal details
- Born: Augsberg
- Died: c. 1150
- Denomination: Roman Catholicism

Udalschalk, Abbot of St Ulrich's and St Afra's Abbey, also known in sources as Uodalscalc, Uodalschalus, Uodalscalcus, Odalschalchus and Udalscalcus was a German Benedictine historian, writer, composer and copyist, active in Augsburg, Konstanz and Rome. He was a minor literary opponent of the Imperial party during the Investiture Controversy.

== Life ==
=== Monk ===
Born in Augsburg, he debated the Imperial-invested Hermann II of Augsburg alongside Egino, who was then abbot and Udalschalk's superior. This engagement is only recorded in the Uodalscalcus de Eginone et Herimanno (MG. SS. XII, 429), with Udalschalk accusing Hermann of making his brother, Patriarch Ulric of Aquleia, commit simony by bribing Henry IV so that Hermann could be invested as bishop by Henry. After Egino fled Augsberg in 1120, Udalschalk went to Konstanz, where he compiled the life of Bishop Conrad of Konstanz for the purpose of canonisation. At around the same time as the biography of Conrad's completion in 1123, Udalschalk also wrote a biography of Adalbero of Augsberg.

=== Abbot ===
In 1125, he was unanimously elected as the Abbot of St Ulrich's and St Afra's Abbey, succeeding Wollemar. He compiled his registrum tonorum, a set of musical devotional offices for St Conrad and St Ulrich with rare surviving Southern German notation, before dying sometime between 1149 and 1151.
