= Paul Fugger von Kirchberg und Weißenhorn =

German politician

Paul Graf Fugger or Paul Graf Fugger-Kirchberg-Weißenhorn (13 October 1637, Augsburg - 27 April 1701, Munich) was a German politician of the Fugger family. He was a Reichshofrat and an Electoral Bavarian Obersthofmeister. He was the fifteenth child of Otto Heinrich Fugger.
