= Michael Echter =

German painter (1812–1879)

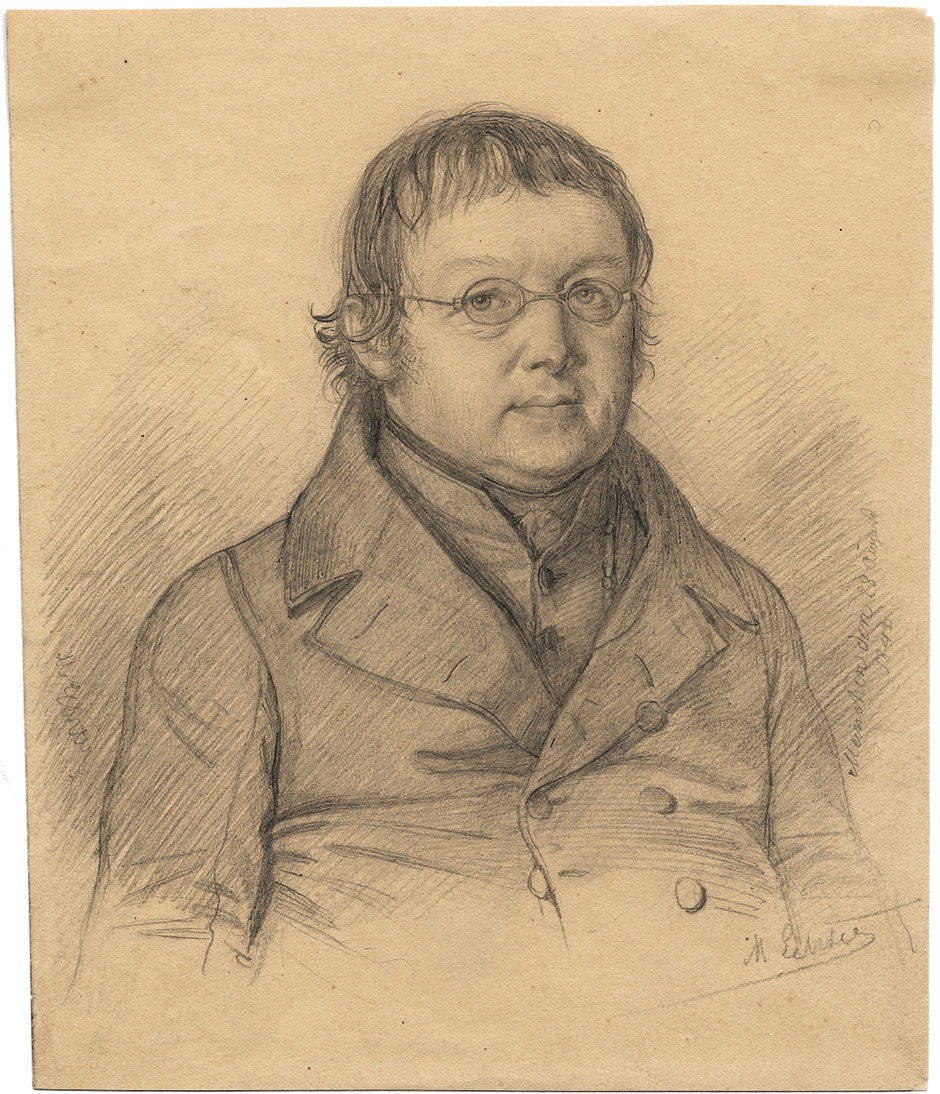
Self portrait, 1842

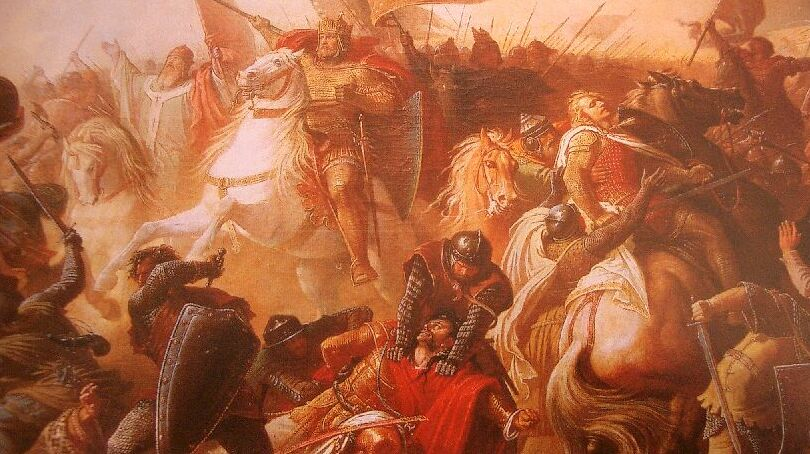
The Battle of Lechfeld (detail)

Michael Echter (5 March 1812, Munich – 4 February 1879, Munich) was a German painter, known primarily for historical scenes.

== Biography ==
He studied at the Academy of Fine Arts, Munich with Heinrich Maria von Hess, Clemens von Zimmermann and Julius Schnorr. Later, he assisted Schnorr in decorating the Munich Residenz. In 1847, he accompanied Wilhelm von Kaulbach to Berlin to help decorate the Neues Museum. Kaulbach had a decisive influence on his style.

He became member of the Academy in 1862, and a professor at the School of Arts and Industry in 1868. Among his numerous awards are the Order of St. Michael and the Order of Leopold.

Notable works include: St. George, Peter Delivered from Prison, Walk to Emmaus, Treaty of Pavia (in the Maximilianeum), Barbarossa's Wedding, Burial of Walther von der Vogelweide (in the Bavarian National Museum), Four Elements, Telegraphy and Railroad Travelling, Central Railway Station, Munich, thirty Scenes from Wagner's Operas (Royal Palace, Munich), Fancy and Poetry, Aurora, and the Twelve Months represented by children's figures.

== See also ==
- List of German painters
