= Saint Egino =

Italian Roman Catholic saint

- Born: Augsburg, Bavaria, Germany
- Died: 1122; Pisa, Italy
- Venerated in: Catholic Church
- Major shrine: Carmelite Monastery of St. Michael, Pisa, Italy
- Feast: 15 July

Egino was born in Augsburg, Bavaria, Germany, was Camaldolese abbot involved in the many disputes of his era. Egino was placed in the abbey of Sts. Ulric and Afra as a child. He became abbot of the abbey but was expelled when he supported Pope Callistus II against Emperor Henry V in a dispute. Residing in St. Blaise Abbey, he returned to Augsburg in 1106, resuming his office of abbot in 1109. In 1120, Egino fled to Rome because of his opposition to Bishop Hermann, who according to Udalschalk, a monk of the abbey and associate of Egino, practiced simony. Returning to Augsburg two years later, he died in Pisa.
