= Hermann II of Augsburg =

Prince-Bishop of Augsburg from 1096 to 1133

- Prince-Bishop of Augsburg
- Diocese: Augsburg
- In office: 1096 – 1133
- Predecessor: Siegfried II of Augsburg
- Successor: Walter I of Augsburg

Personal details
- Died: 19 March 1133
- Denomination: Roman Catholic

Hermann II of Augsburg, was bishop of Augsburg during the period 1096–1133.

Hermann was appointed as bishop by Holy Roman Emperor Henry IV in 1096 in Verona. Patriarch Ulric of Aquileia consecrated him. According to the monk Udalscalc, Hermann's brother Ulric paid Henry IV to appoint Hermann.

Hermann II was a layman prior to his appointment from the house of Eppenstein, as was his brother.

== Notes and references ==
Catholic Church titles
Preceded by Siegfried II	Prince-Bishop of Augsburg; 1096 – 1133	Succeeded by Walter I
