= Abbey of Saints Ulrich and Afra =

Former Benedictine abbey in Bavaria

Coordinates: 48°21′41″N 10°54′01″E

Imperial Abbey of Saints Ulrich and Afra, Augsburg Reichskloster Sankt Ulrich und Afra in Augsburg
- 1577^{a} / 1643^{b} – 1802
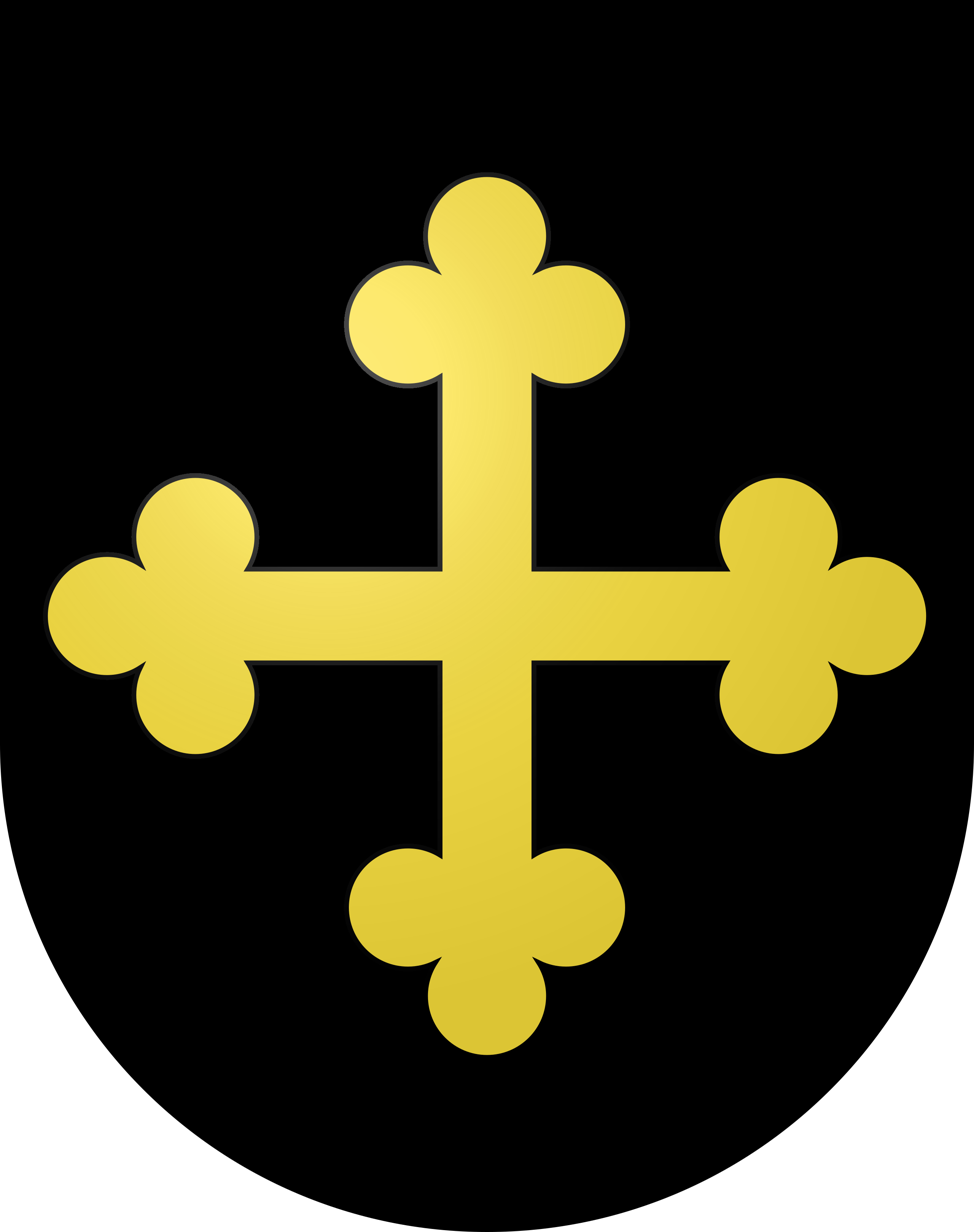
- Coat of arms

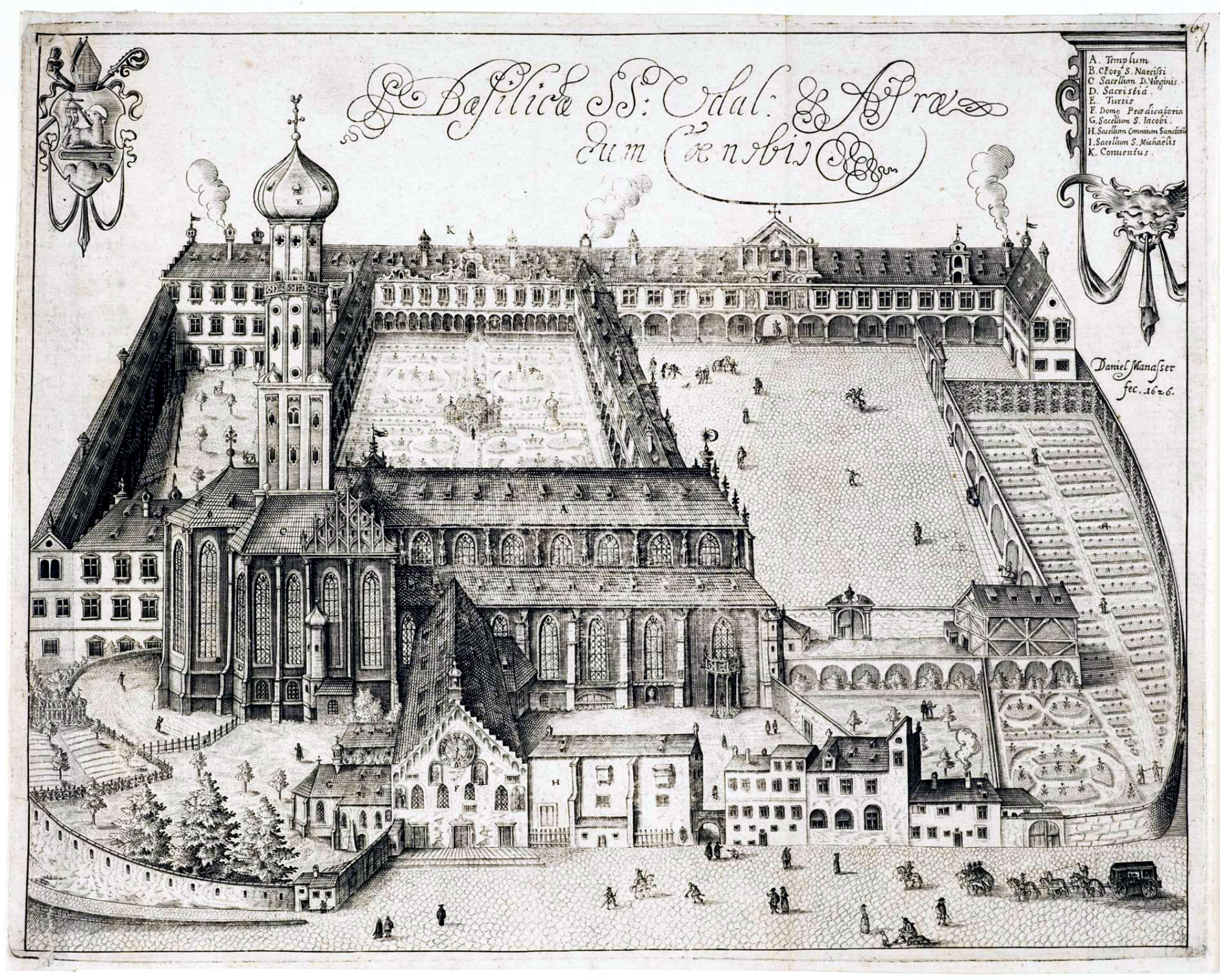
- The abbey of St. Ulrich and Afra in 1627
- Status: Imperial Abbey
- Capital: St Ulrich's and St Afra's Abbey
- Government: Elective principality
- Historical era: Middle Ages
  - Founded: ca 10th century
  - Gained immediacy: 1577
  - Immediacy accepted by Bp Augsburg: 1643/44
  - Secularised to Augsburg (Imp. City) and Bavaria: 1802
  - City mediatised to Bavaria: 1806
Preceded by	Succeeded by
Prince-Bishopric of Augsburg	Augsburg; Electorate of Bavaria
- Today part of: Germany
- a: De jure b: De facto

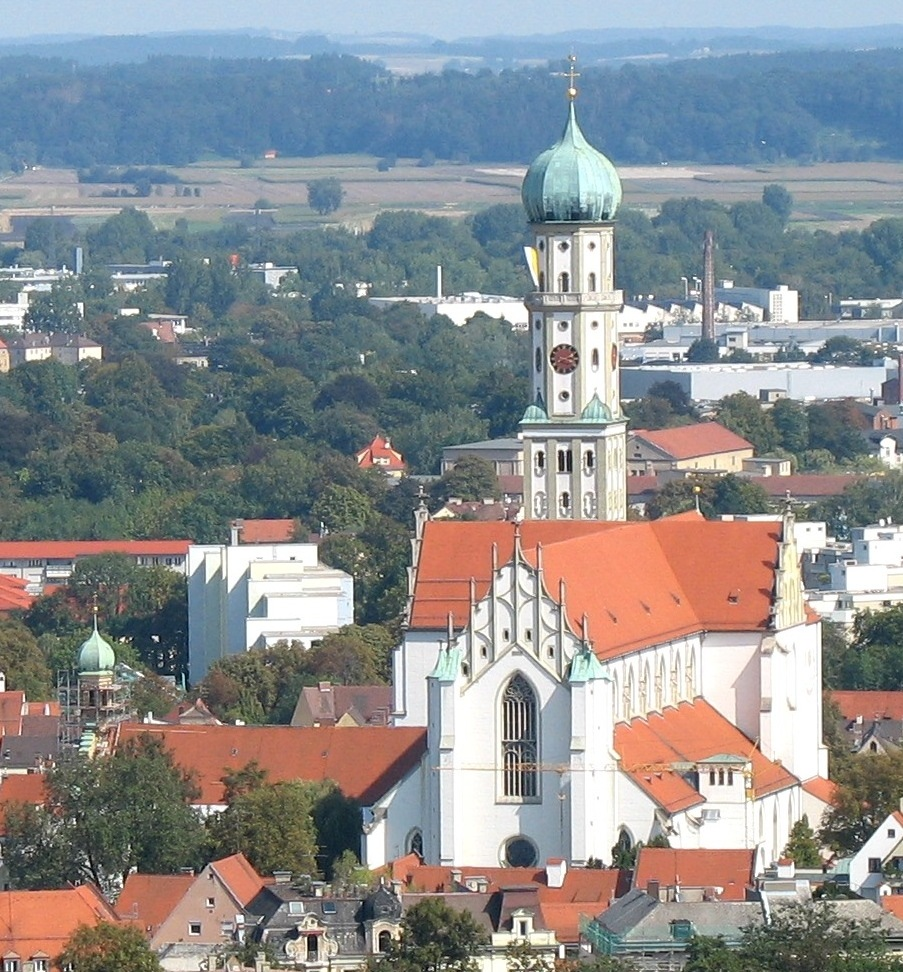
Exterior of the abbey church

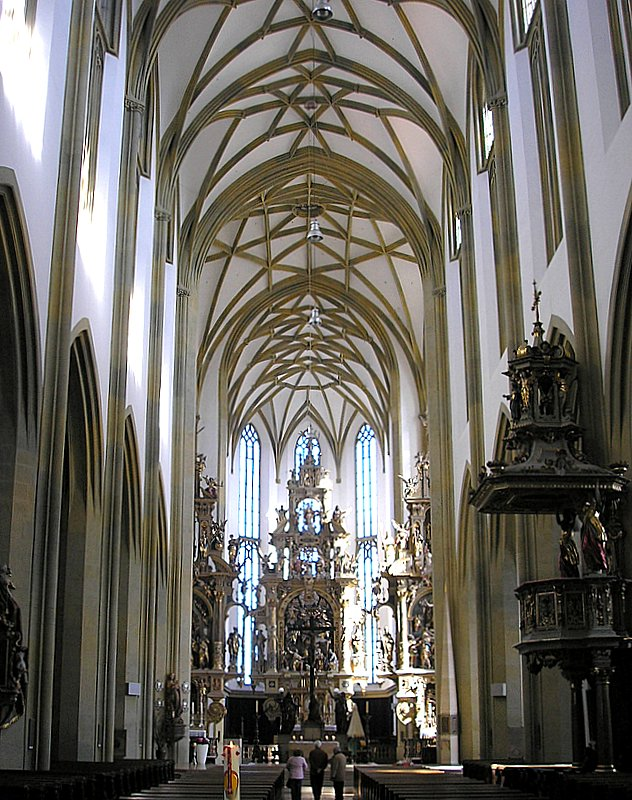
Interior of the abbey church, looking east

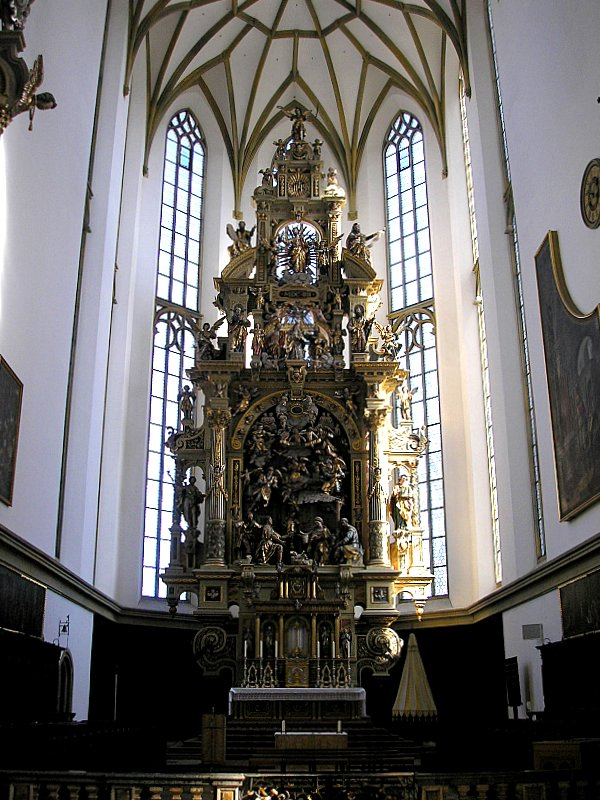
High altar in the abbey church

The Abbey of Saints Ulrich and Afra (German: Kloster Sankt Ulrich und Afra Augsburg) is a former Benedictine abbey in the south of the old city in Augsburg, Bavaria. It was dedicated to Saint Ulrich and Saint Afra.

From the late 16th century onward, the Abbey of St. Ulrich and St Afra was one of the 40-odd self-ruling imperial abbeys of the Holy Roman Empire and, as such, was a virtually independent state. The territory of that state was very fragmented: the abbey of St. Ulrich and St Afra proper enclaved within the Free Imperial City of Augsburg, and several small territories disseminated throughout the region. At the time of its dissolution in 1802, the Imperial Abbey covered 112 square kilometers and had about 5,000 subjects.

== History ==
The Benedictine monastery was preceded by an original foundation established at an uncertain date, but at least as early as the 10th century (and in its turn quite possibly a refoundation of a still earlier one from the 5th or 6th centuries), by the "Kollegiatstift St. Afra", a community of the priests charged with the care of St Afra's Church (now the Basilica of Saints Ulrich and Afra), where the relics of Saint Afra were venerated, and next door to which the community premises were built. Between 1006 and 1012, Bruno, Bishop of Augsburg, removed the canons to the cathedral chapter and gave the premises to Benedictine monks whom he brought from Tegernsee Abbey, thus turning it into a Benedictine monastery.

=== Imperial Abbey ===
Abbot Jakob Köplin (1548–1600) succeeded in having St. Ulrich and Afra's long standing claim to Imperial immediacy (German: Reichsfreiheit) recognized in 1577, thus confirming the abbey as a self-ruling Imperial estate, but this status was bitterly contested by the bishops of Augsburg, and the legal conflict was resolved in favour of the abbey only in 1643/44. The abbot had a seat and a vote on the bench of the Prelates of Swabia at the Imperial Diet. During those years the abbey acquired sovereign rights over the village of Haunstetten, known as Ulrikanisches Dorf, ("Ulrich's village"), south of Augsburg, and a few other more distant possessions. Inside Augsburg however, St. Ulrich and Afra's sovereign rule extended only over the grounds of the abbey church and monastery. At the time of the secularisation of the abbey in 1802, it owned in and near Augsburg about a hundred houses as well as gardens, meadows and mills, and the Upper Lech bridge and toll house.

The abbey was dissolved in 1802 during the secularisation of Bavaria. The city of Augsburg and the Duchy of Bavaria divided its territory between them. The monks however were permitted to remain in the premises of the dissolved monastery. In 1805 a French military hospital was installed here; after six monks, including the abbot, had died of infectious diseases, the remainder moved into a private house. The hospital was replaced in 1807 by a Bavarian cavalry barracks, known as the "Ulrichskaserne".

The barracks remained here until World War II, when in 1944 the buildings were largely destroyed. The remains were not cleared until 1968–71. On the site the "Haus St. Ulrich" has stood since 1975, an academy and pastoral centre of the Diocese of Augsburg. The sarcophaguses of Saint Afra and Saint Ulrich are preserved in the crypt.

== Abbots of St. Ulrich's and St. Afra's Abbey ==
- Regimbald (c. 1012–15)
- Dego (1015–18)
- Gotstegen (1018–20)
- Fridebold (1020–30)
- Heinrich I (1031–44)
- Tieto (1044–50)
- Adelhalm (1050–65)
- Diemar (1065–80)
- Sigehard (1080–ca 1094)
- Hartmann (1094–96)
- Berengar (1096–1107)
- Adalbero (1107–09)
- Gunther (−1109)
- Egino (1109–20)
- Wollemar (1122–26)
- Udalschalk (1127–51)
- Hezilo (1156–64)
- Ulrich I of Biberbach (1169–74)
- Heinrich II of Meysach (1177–79)
- Manegold (1182–84)
- Heinrich III (1187–90)
- Erchenbold (1193–1200)
- Ulrich II (−1204)
- Heinrich IV of Belsheim (1213–16)
- Dietho (1221–25)
- Luitfrid (1225–30)
- Hiltibrand of Thierheim (1234–41)
- Gebwin of Thierheim (1241–66)
- Dietrich of Rodt (1277–88)
- Sibotho Stolzkirch (1288–92)
- Heinrich V von Hagenau (1292–1315)
- Marquard von Hageln (1316–34)
- Konrad I Winkler (1334–55)
- Johannes I von Vischach (1355–66)
- Friedrich von Gummeringen (1368–79)
- Heinrich VI von Gabelbach (1382–96)
- Johannes II Lauginger (1396–1403)
- Johannes III Küssinger (1404–28)
- Heinrich VII Heutter (−1439)
- Johannes IV von Hohenstein (1439–58)
- Melchior von Stamheim (1458–74)
- Heinrich VIII Fryess (1474–82)
- Johannes V von Giltingen (1482–96)
- Konrad II Moerlin (1496–1510)
- Johannes VI Schrott (1510–27)
- Johannes VII Koenlin (1527–39)
- Heinrich von Foehr (1539–48)
- Jakob Koepplin (1548–1600)
- Johannes VIII Merk (1600–32)
- Bernhard Hertfelder (1632–64)
- Gregor I Jos (1664–74)
- Roman Daniel (1674–94)
- Willibald Popp (1694–1735)
- Coelestin Mayr (1735–53)
- Joseph Maria von Langenmantl (1753–90)
- Wikterp Grundner (1790–95)
- Gregor II Schäffler (1795–1802)

== Burials ==
- Simpert (d. 807), bishop, abbot and confessor

== See also ==
- 17th-century Western domes

== Bibliography ==
- Hemmerle, J., 1970. Die Benediktinerklöster in Bayern (= Germania Benedictina, vol. 2), pp. 45–50. Ottobeuren.
