= Basilica of Saints Ulrich and Afra =

Coordinates: 48°21′41″N 10°54′01″E

- Basilika SS. Ulrich and Afra
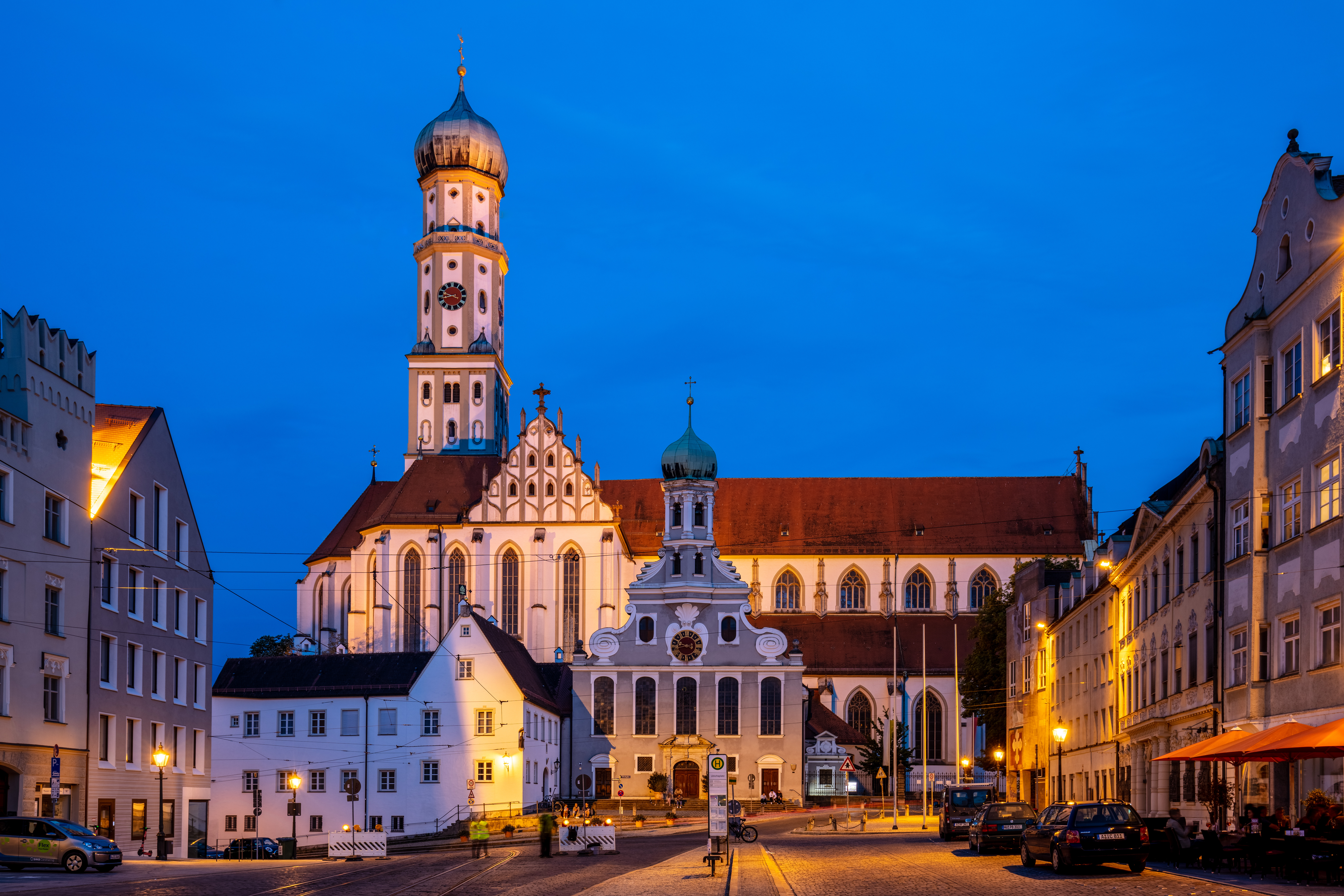
- Basilica of Saints Ulrich and Afra
- Location: Augsburg
- Country: Germany
- Denomination: Roman Catholic Church

The Basilica of Saints Ulrich and Afra (German: Basilika SS. Ulrich and Afra) is a Catholic parish in Augsburg in Bavaria, which originated from the Roman tomb of Saint Afra, who was martyred in 304.

The building is a great example of Gothic architecture in Germany; in its interior it conserves three enormous and very precious altars of Renaissance, each of which is considered a masterpiece of the German sculpture of the period. Its high bell tower with an "onion" dome, which dominates the city to the south, served as a prototype for the construction of numerous baroque towers of Bavaria.

In 1577 (officially) and 1643–1644 (virtually) the church, which was called the Benedictine abbey of Saints Ulrich and Afra, was elevated to the rank of imperial abbey. On October 18, 1777, a Wolfgang Amadeus Mozart organ concert was held. On May 4, 1782, Pope Pius VI celebrated Mass in the basilica. Secularized in 1802, it entered the possession of the State of Bavaria. In 1810 the church was elevated to a parish church. From July 4, 1937, it was declared by Pope Pius XI as a minor basilica. On May 4, 1987, it was visited by Pope John Paul II.

== See also ==
- Roman Catholicism in Germany
- St. Ulrich's and St. Afra's Abbey
- Official website of the church (German)
- Basilica of Saints Ulrich and Afra on Monuments of Germany - photoalbum

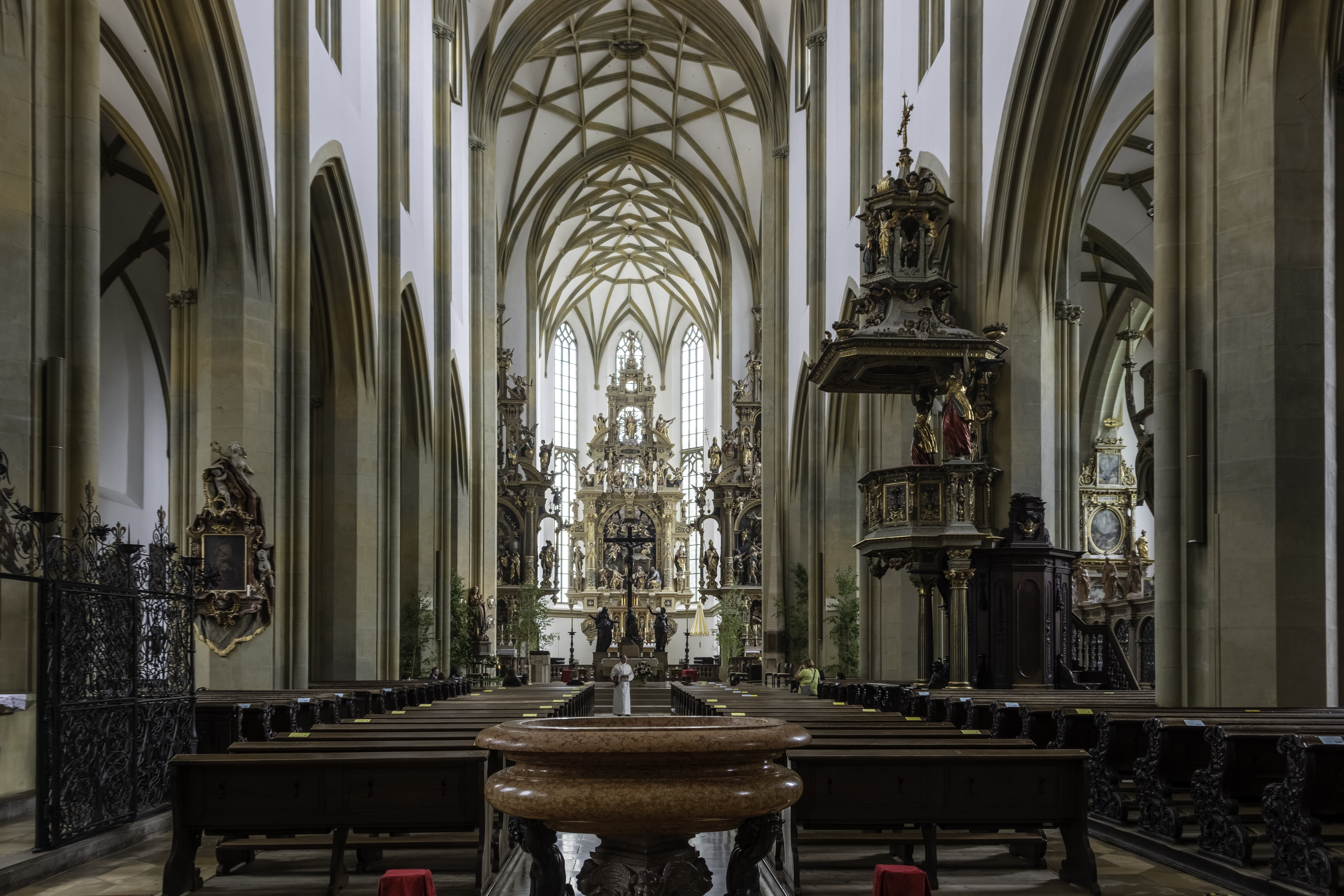
Internal view
