= Rose Graham (historian) =

English religious historian (1875–1963)

Rose Graham CBE FSA FRHistS
- Born: 16 August 1875; London, England
- Died: 29 July 1963 (aged 87); London, England
- Occupations: Historian and academic

Academic background
- Education: Notting Hill and Ealing High School
- Alma mater: Somerville College, Oxford

Academic work
- Institutions: Royal Commission on Historical Monuments

Rose Graham CBE FSA FRHistS (16 August 1875 – 29 July 1963) was a British religious historian.

== Life ==
Graham was born in London in 1875 to W. Edgar Graham and Jane (née Newton). She was educated at Notting Hill High School and Somerville College, Oxford.

After graduating, Graham embarked on a research career that saw her producing a series of books on church history, the first of which was a study of St Gilbert of Sempringham, founder of a double monastery. Graham was encouraged by her mother and with her she travelled in France to research her second book. She wasn't able to gain a degree until 1920 from Oxford. She was awarded a Doctor of Letters (DLitt) degree by Oxford in 1929. She was made an Honorary Fellow of Somerville College in 1933, and worked as a member of the Royal Commission on Historical Monuments from 1934 to 1963.

In 1945 she became the first female president of the British Archaeological Association which she held until 1951 when she served on as vice president until 1963. She had also been elected a Fellow of the Society of Antiquaries of London (FSA) and a Fellow of the Royal Historical Society (FRHistS).

She died on 29 July 1963. Her early work on ecclesiastical history is seen as a great foundation for later scholarship on women's history.
