= Frohnlach =

- Ortsteil of Ebersdorf bei Coburg
- Interactive map of Frohnlach
- Location within Germany Location within Bavaria
- Coordinates: 50°13′00″N 11°05′16″E
- Country: Germany
- State: Bavaria
- Admin. region: Oberfranken
- District: Coburg
- Municipality: Ebersdorf bei Coburg

Area
  - Total: 26.50 km^{2} (10.23 sq mi)
- Elevation: 310 m (1,020 ft)

Population
  - Total: 2,000
  - Density: 75/km^{2} (200/sq mi)
- Time zone: UTC+01:00 (CET)
  - Summer (DST): UTC+02:00 (CEST)
- Postal codes: 96237
- Dialling codes: 09562
- Vehicle registration: CO
- Website: www.frohnlach.de

Frohnlach is located in Upper Franconia (Oberfranken) in the district of (Landkreis) Coburg. It is the easternmost part of the municipality (Gemeinde) of Ebersdorf bei Coburg and, with around 2,000 inhabitants, the largest district after Ebersdorf.

== Geography ==
Frohnlach is located on Bundesstraße 303, 6.4 miles (or 10.3 km) southeast of Coburg near the Thuringian border and at the northern edge of the Lichtenfels Forest.

== History ==
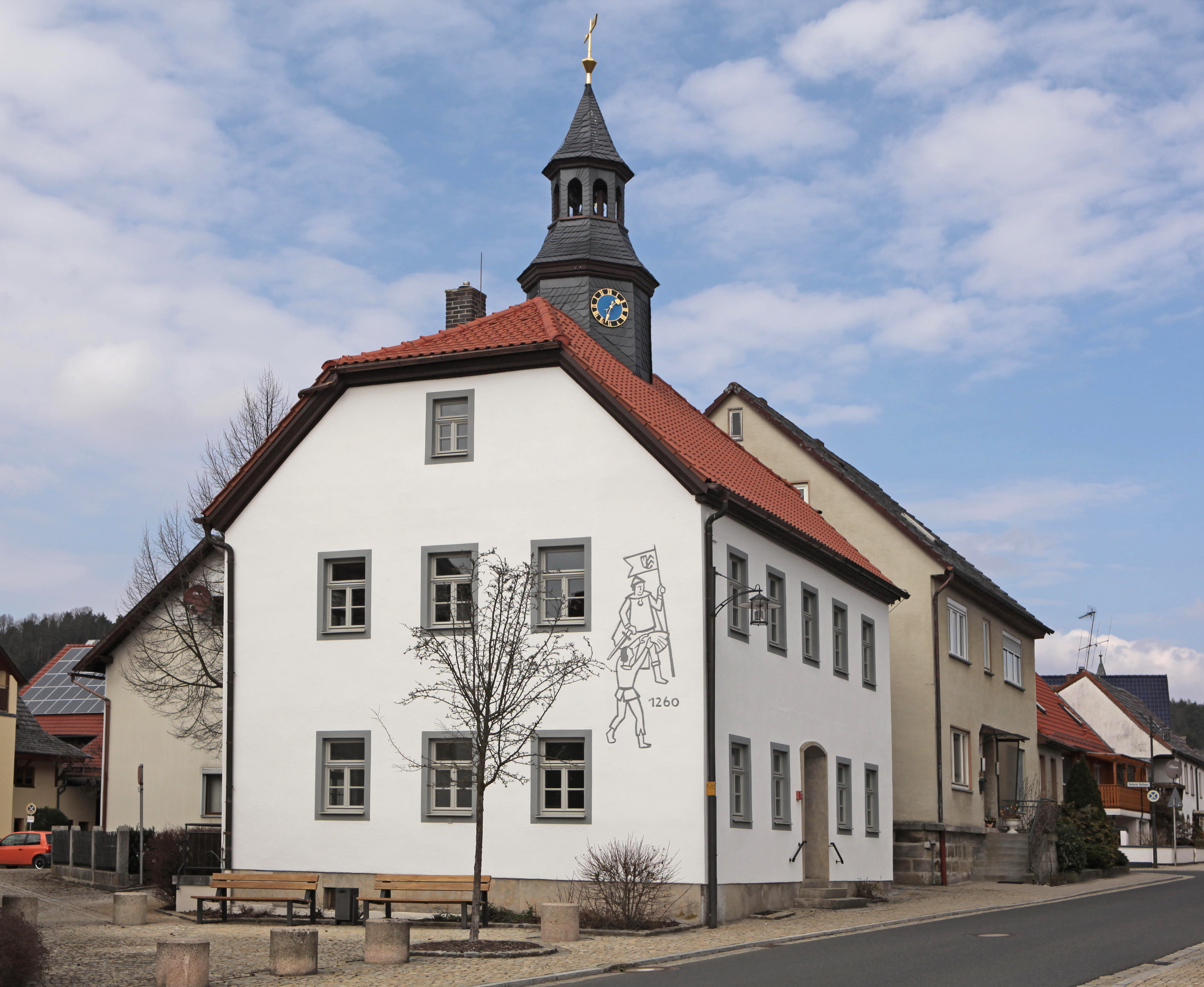
Former Rathaus [Town Hall]

=== In the Beginning ===
The Lichtenfels Forest – a former Imperial forest – was in the possession of the Fulda Abbey in the 10th century; it was gained in the year 1070 by the hand of the Markgräfin [Countess of the Marches] Alberada with the founding of the Banz Abbey to the Diocese of Bamberg, and was later of greater importance for the Sonnefeld Monastery and its surrounding villages.

At the edge of the Lichtenfels Forest, a settlement called vronenloh was built in the 11th century with the clearing of the woodlands. Its name roughly meant “manorial forest [Herrenwald]”. The first mention of Frohnlach was in the year 1260 when the founder of the Sonnefeld Monastery, Graf [Count] Henry II von Sonneberg, bought the village of “Otnandus de sleten” (from Kirchschletten near Zapfendorf). It is possible that Frohnlach might be older than that, but proof of its true age has not yet been found in any of the civil and church archives of Germany.

=== To The Nunnery ===
Henry II did not keep Frohnlach for long. On 7 January 1260, according to the records of the Bishop of Bamberg, Henry came to the Cathedral of Bamberg and announced, by placing his cape on the Altar of St. Peter, that he was handing over the villages of Ebersdorf and Frohnlach to the Church. At that time, these villages were owned in part by the Bishop and Cathedral of Bamberg as fiefs. To fulfill Henry's wishes, the villages were conveyed to Jutta von Maidbronn, the Abbess of the Cistercian cloistered monastery of Maidbronn near Würzburg. She was instructed, with the nuns from her cloister, to build a new nunnery, “Sunnental [Valley of the Sun]”, at a place called “Superius Eberharts-Dorf [Upper Village of Eberhard]”, which they took under their separate protection. They were allowed to obtain for their new convent from their woodlands – the Lichtenfels Forest – timber for the construction and commerce.

On 13 February 1260, Bishop Iringus of Würzburg, as the legitimate Bishop of the Diocese, granted his consent to the establishment of the Cloister on the “slope of the birch trees [Birkenleite]” near Frohnlach. He approved for the Cloister the Charter of the Cistercian Order and forbade, as the Bishop of Bamberg already did, the bailiffs from asserting their authority over the Cloister's properties.

On 23 April 1260 Henry II von Sonneberg gave the newly founded monastery, as the first present, the village of Frohnlach, and on 29 July 1264 Heinrich and his wife Kunigundis handed over their properties to the now finished monastery of Sonnefeld. Amongst them, the Bishop of Bamberg included the village of Frohnlach as well as three manors in “schnien (Schney)”. In the year 1281, the income from Frohnlach was presented to the Monastery for the second time by Dietrich von Kulmbach and in 1285, Konrad von Wildberg donated the village of Frohnlach with all the goods and income to the Monastery for the third time.

So far, all the history and local researchers have been of the view that the founding of the Sonnefeld Monastery in Ebersdorf or Frohnlach was only a plan that did not happen because of all the possible misgivings. Walter Lorenz from Coburg in his doctoral thesis “Campus Solis” [“Field of the Sun”, the Latin name of Sonnefeld], (History of the Sonnefeld Monastery) has provided evidence that the monastery in the year 1264 was fully furnished and staffed with nuns. It stood near Ebersdorf. An exact location of the Cloister is not known, but since the deeds of the foundation mentioned Ebersdorf at one time and Frohnlach at another time, it can be assumed that the Cloister may have been standing probably on or at the Altfrohnlachsberg [German for "Old Frohnlach Mountain"] near the field separating Ebersdorf and Frohnlach. The deed of the founding from the year 1264 says at the end: “And so the Congregation and the Convent of the Nuns was consecrated in Ebersdorf and named under lucky omens Sonnefeld [Und so wurde die Kongregation und der Konvent der Nonnen in Ebersdorf eingeweiht und unter glücklichen Vorzeichen Sonnefeld genannt]”. Because of these facts, it could also be inferred that the present Evangelical Lutheran parish church in Ebersdorf, which was created out of a chapel mentioned in the year 1274, is either dated from the time of the founding of the Sonnefeld Monastery or related to the same founding itself. This former chapel could have served for the Konversen or lay brothers of the Cloister – secular servants of the Cloister – as the House of God because they were not allowed to enter the church of the nuns. In the year 1287, an enormous fire burned the nunnery near Ebersdorf or Frohnlach to the ashes. Fourteen bishops granted indulgences from the Imperial synod in Würzburg to the Cloister. Lay brothers went from church to church through the dioceses, announced the indulgence and collected donations for the reconstruction. Very quickly, the Monastery was in the position to build the necessary structures again. The new buildings were created at the village of Hofstädten. Only after completion, the Monastery was then moved to Hofstädten, but Frohnlach would remain in the property of the Sonnefeld Monastery until 1532.

The donations of Henry II also established the lands south of Frohnlach – the southeastern part of the Coburger Land – as a part of the borderland between the Bishopric of Fulda and the Diocese of Bamberg. This boundary, a few hundred yards south of the village, has survived for about 900 years and is still known to us as a former border between Old Bavaria and Saxe-Coburg.

=== A Good Life Under the Croiser ===
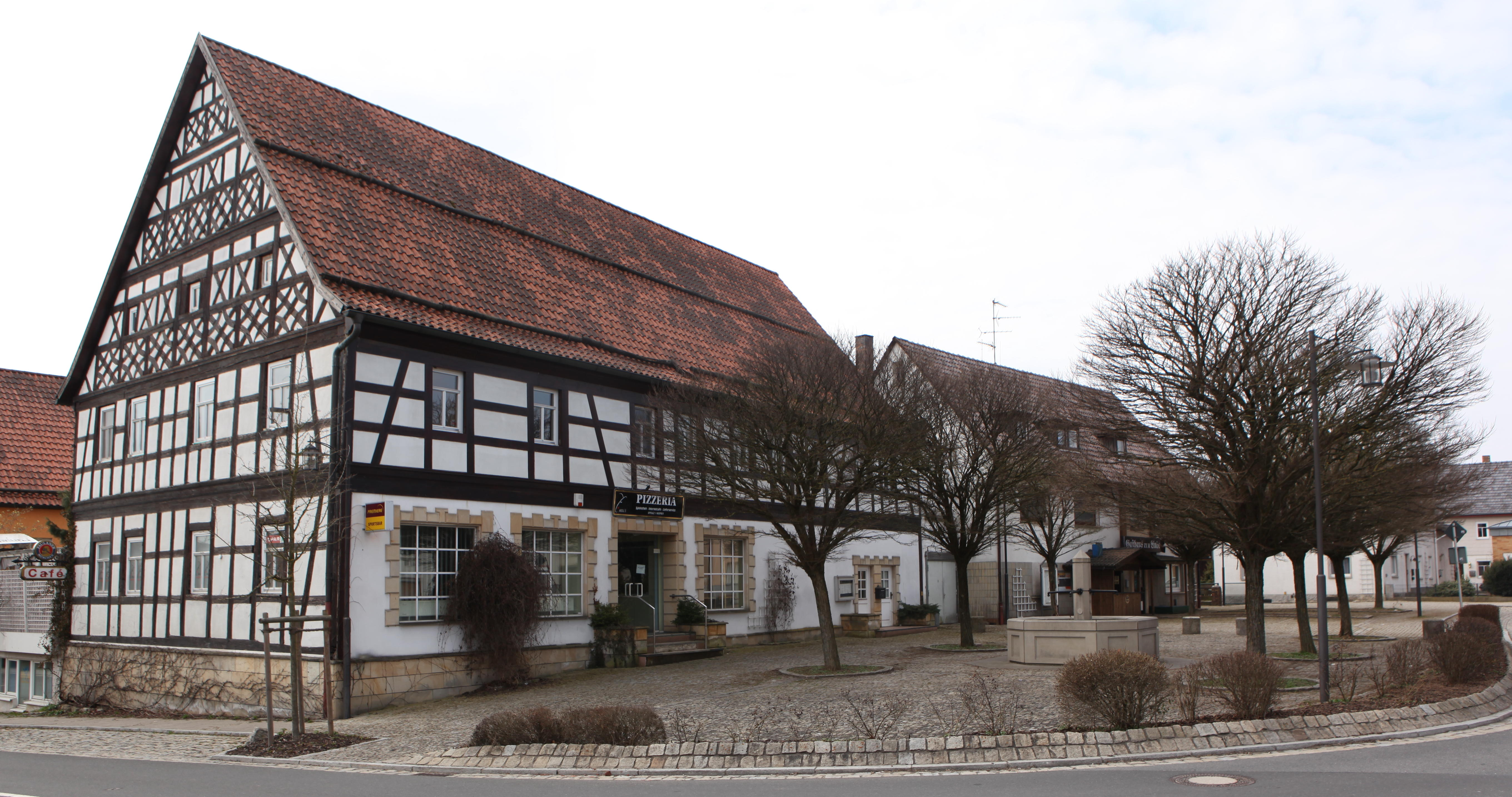
Hauptstraße 1, former inn Goldener Adler [Golden Eagle]

As long as the Sonnefeld Monastery owned Frohnlach, it gave its residents the lands for the farming. In return, they farmed them to deliver the tithes and provided the compulsory labor. The pitchforks of the place would be merged with the arms of Frohnlach. In 1508, for its defense, Frohnlach had 25 able-bodied men who were armed with 25 morions [Sturmhauben], 12 rollers [Gollers], 19 breastplates, 3 pairs of arm-guards, 28 pikes, 5 halberds, 2 guns and 25 knives. Frohnlach must have possessed the municipal rights around 1400, because in 1467 and in the following years, the people of Frohnlach resisted the restrictions of their trading rights.

Over the centuries, even individual craftsmen, such as coopers [Weißbüttner], butchers [Metzger], bakers [Bäcker] and innkeepers [Gastwirte] worked for the monastery. The inn, now House No. 43, is worth noting. Even in the days of the monastery it was a tavern, and it belonged to the Cloister. The inhabitants of Frohnlach were making their livings with the Monastery, and life was described with the old quote: “Under the Crosier was the good life [Unter dem Krummstab war gut leben]”.

In 1532, the spread of the Reformation dissolved the Monastery, sending its properties, including Frohnlach, to the Protestant Electorate of Saxony. The Electorate assigned them to the secular Judicial District of [Justizamt] Sonnefeld. By then, the first privately owned properties were already beginning to appear in Frohnlach because of the decades of mismanagement of the Monastery and the aftereffects of the revolutionary Bauernkrieg (German Peasants War).

=== Thirty Years' War ===
The one-street village was overrun and impoverished by long and frequent billeting and the wild hordes of soldiers who plundered at will, tore down and burned houses. The back and forth brought Imperial troops, Hungarians, Croats, and Lombards, and Generalwachtmeister (Major General)] Heinrich Holk’s cavalrymen and even ravagers from Kronach to the place. In the year 1635 the country was so impoverished, “that also here many people had to leave houses and farms, many because of lack of the necessary nourishment had to fill themselves with earth, bran and dusty flour bread, tree bark, oil-cakes, skins of grapes, dogs, cats, and, yes, even carrion. Also, because malignant and horrible sickness came out of this, many died and many had to languish from hunger. Since the soldiers had taken away all the horses and cattle, the farmers have to push themselves against the plow, so that they might only grow something [daß auch hier viele Leute Haus und Hof verlassen mußten, viele wegen Mangel der notwendigen Nahrung sich mit Erde, Kleie und Staubmehlbrot, Baumrinde, Leinkuchen, Treber, Hunden, Katzen, ja sogar mit Aas sättigten. Auch weil daraus giftige und abscheuliche Krankheiten entstanden, starben viele und mußten vor Hunger verschmachten. Da die Soldaten alle Pferde und Rinder weggeführt hatten, haben sich die Bauern selbst in die Pflüge gespannt, damit sie nur etwas anbauen möchten].”

=== Napoleonic and Other Wars ===
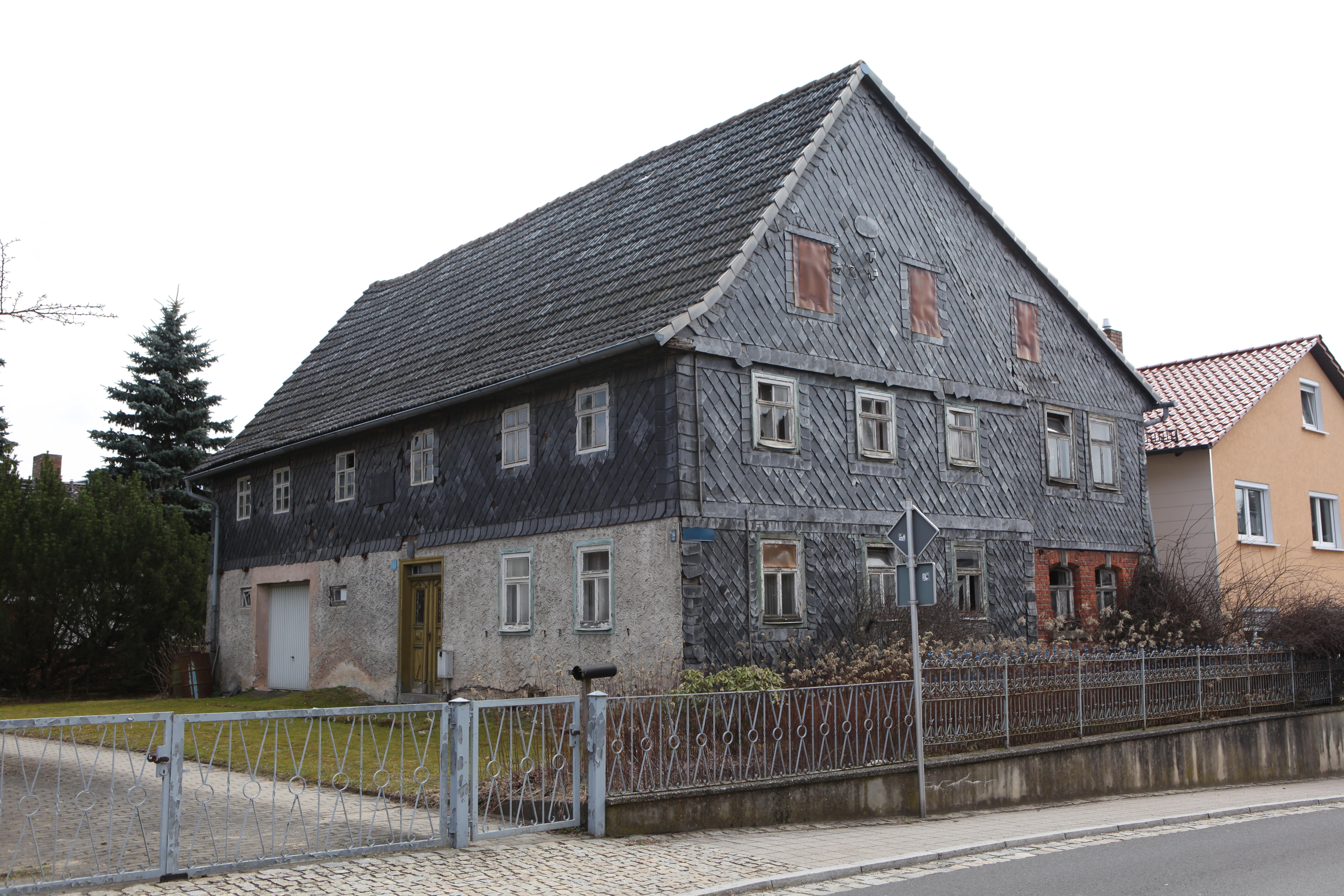
Kellergasse 1, timbered house dating from 1854

When Napoleon I was marching out of Bavaria against the Prussians, two units of his army camped on the Altfrohnlachsberg and at the Dürrmühle. Finds of their equipment and coins were made all the time in the following years. In the local dialect, the source at the mill is still called the Napoleonsbrünnlein [“Napoleon’s Little Spring”].

In 1826 the District of Sonnefeld and therefore Frohnlach fell to the Duchy of Saxe-Coburg and Gotha. At the boundary between northern and southern Germany, where the "Field Barrier" was put in force at Frohnlach by the Deutschen Zollverein [German Customs Union] on 1 January 1834, organized smuggling flourished. Up to 500 men came in the darkness with packs up to 60 Pfund (30 kilograms or 66 American pounds) over the border and provided good extra income. The smuggling transfer place on the other side was in Schney.

In the year 1848, as the revolutionary waves flowed from France, they found an echo in Frohnlach. For this reason, the military forces of Saxe-Weimar-Eisenach had to stay in the village for some time for the suppression of “demagogic activities”. In the Franco-German War two men from Frohnlach found death. They were joined by 51 more from the World War I and 54 from World War II .

== Schools ==
In 1895 and 1896 Frohnlach got its own school, which was built in 1935 and expanded in 1960. In 1969 it became a part of the School Association of Ebersdorf. In 1975, it was training three teachers of the third scholastic year of the school association.

== Consolidation ==
On 1 May 1978 Frohnlach was incorporated into the municipality of [Gemeinde] Ebersdorf.

== Economy ==
Since the 14th century, Frohnlach was in the coopering trade at home, ultimately enshrining in the village's image the arches (piles of the tub handles). The coopers had a good income and could give their goods to the Schwürbitzer Flößern [Bavarian raftsmen from Schwürbitz, 4.29 miles or 7 km southeast of Frohnlach, for going up and down the Main River] for sale to Frankfurt am Main. Through a series of construction, fuel and commercial rights [Bau-, Brenn- und Nutzholzrechte], they were able to obtain favorable trunks from the Lichtenfels Forest. They were always the thorn in the forest rangers and the Forestry District, and these rights were constantly curtailed and narrowed in the years 1384, 1475, 1537, 1601 and 1752. Nevertheless, there were in Frohnlach 1793 only 60 coopers, and that number in 1906 had shrunken to 3. Today, the craft is extinct.

As the foothold of the basketmaking craft took hold in the neighboring Michelau (3.674 miles or 6 km southeast of Frohnlach), the people of Frohnlach switched to this trade. Attempts by a few of Frohnlach's basketmakers after World War I to establish a business and the basketwares in industrial production failed to produce results and the companies perished again. Only a few master craftsmen were able to stay above the water. The basketmakers were able to have, with good years of work, sufficient profits but not as much as they did before. However, in the bad times of 1929–1933, unemployment and hunger were regular guests at the homes of the basketmakers. The years 1934 to 1939 brought another recovery, caused by the rise of the Third Reich, but by the beginning of World War II, the boom stopped and 1945 ended in total collapse. After 1945, the articles of the basketmakers, such as wicker chairs, stools and chests, were created as household goods and also good items for the barter and black markets, when they were only made out of substituted materials such as shavings, shreddings and cardboard. Several specialists even traveled as far as Württemberg and Baden with these articles to exchange them for fruit, brandy, potatoes, corn and anything else to eat.

After the currency reforms of 1948, the first independent contractors had to build and deliver their goods directly to the department stores and large buying groups. This was the basis for the industrial production and the companies and workshops grew from year to year, even today. On top of that, a pent-up demand for these goods was found in the cities bombed during the war and sales increased steadily.

The local firms produce today – in accordance with the requirements of the market – mostly upholstered and plastic furniture in great industrial companies, through which each of the two largest companies in 1975 employed approximately 400 workers.

== Transport ==
Frohnlach is the industrial location for furniture and upholstery. In the matters of transport, Frohnlach is well connected. It has a direct connection with the Bundesstraße 303 (Schweinfurt – Wunsiedel). A junction of the Bundesautobahn 73, located near Ebersdorf bei Coburg, leads to Suhl and since Autumn 2008 to Bamberg.

== Miscellaneous ==
Frohnlach is known, among other things, for its successful soccer club, the VfL Frohnlach.

The local dialect of Frohnlach belongs to Itzgründisch (East Franconian, High German).

== Notable residents ==
- Johann Stegner (1866–1954), a Social Democratic Party of Germany politician, was born in Frohnlach.

== Literature ==
- (in German) Walter Lorenz: Campus Solis – Geschichte und Besitz der ehemaligen Zisterzienserinnenabtei Sonnefeld bei Coburg [“Field of the Sun” – History and Occupancy of the former Cistercian Cloistered Abbey of Sonnefeld bei Coburg]. Dissertation, Friedrich-Alexander-Universität Erlangen-Nürnberg, 1958.
