= Tina Barney =

American photographer (born 1945)

- Born: Tina Isles; October 27, 1945 (age 81); New York City, US
- Occupation: Photographer
- Spouse: John Joseph Barney
- Family: Emanuel Lehman (great-great-grandfather); Philip Lehman (great-grandfather); Stephane Groueff (step-father); Alexandra Moltke (sister-in-law)

Tina Barney (born October 27, 1945) is an American photographer best known for her large-scale, color portraits of her family and close friends in New York and New England. She is a member of the Lehman family.

== Early life and education ==
Barney was born Tina Isles, one of three children of Philip Henry Isles (1912–1989) and his wife 1940s fashion model Lillian Fox. Her parents later divorced and her mother remarried to writer Stephane Groueff. Her great-grandfather was Emanuel Lehman, co-founder of Lehman Brothers. She was introduced to photography by her grandfather when she was a child. As a teenager, she studied Art History at Spence School in Manhattan, and at the age of 19, she lived in Italy for a time where she was able to further study art. Barney first got involved with photography, when she was asked to volunteer for the Junior Council of the Museum of Modern Art in New York, around 1971, working in the photography department and cataloguing work for a show. She started to collect photographs and go to different galleries, to educate herself on the medium. After moving to Sun Valley, Idaho in 1973, she started to take photography classes as a hobby. While in Idaho, she studied at the Sun Valley Center for Arts and Humanities in Ketchum, from 1976 to 1979. Additionally, she has completed workshops with Frederick Sommer, Roger Mertin, Joyce Niemanas, Duane Michals, Nathan Lyons, John Pfahl, and Robert Cumming.

== Career ==
Barney is most well known for creating large format, colorful photographs of her wealthy, East Coast family. The images straddle the line between candid and tableau photography. The wealthy became an aesthetic in Barney's work, her but "fascination is with the repetition of traditions and rituals. The idea that families no matter where they come from, kind of do the same thing." Barney's work is in the collections of the George Eastman House International Museum of Photography and Film in Rochester, New York; the Museum of Modern Art in New York City; the Museum of Fine Arts in Houston, Texas; the JPMorgan Chase Art Collection in New York City; and the Museum of Contemporary Photography. More recently her work has been shown at the New York State Theater in New York, in 2011; The Barbican Art Centre, London; Museum Folkwang in Essen, Museum der Art Moderne, Salzburg, and others.

Barney has also produced or co-directed short films on the photographers Jan Groover (Jan Groover: Tilting at Space, 1994) and Horst P. Horst (Horst, 1988). She had a documentary filmed about her life, aired 2007 on Sundance Channel, directed by Jaci Judelson. Barney has been the recipient of a John Simon Guggenheim Memorial Fellowship in 1991, and the 2010 Lucie Award for Achievement in Portraiture.

Barney is currently represented by the Kasmin Gallery in New York City.

== Personal life ==
In 1966, she married John Joseph Barney of Watch Hill, Rhode Island. Her brother, Philip Henry Isles II, married to actress Alexandra Moltke

== Notable works ==
- Marina's Room, 1987
- Houselights, 1999
- Jill and the TV, 1989
- The Two Friends, 2002

== Publications ==
- ' 'The Beginning' ' (Radius, 2023)

ISBN 978-1-955161-13-8

- Players (Steidl, 2011) ISBN 3-86521-995-0
- The Europeans (Barbican Art Gallery and Steidl, 2005) ISBN 3-86521-095-3
- Friends and Relations: Photographs by Tina Barney (Smithsonian Institution, 1991) ISBN 1-56098-048-6

== Exhibitions ==
- Les Européens, Les Rencontres d'Arles, France, 2003. Curated by Janet Borden.
- The Europeans, Barbican Art Gallery, London, 2005.
- Players, Janet Borden Inc., New York, 2010.
- The Europeans, Haggerty Museum of Art, Milwaukee, WI, 2012.
- Small Towns, Janet Borden, Inc., New York, 2012.
- The Europeans, Frist Center for the Visual Arts, Nashville, TN, 2015.
- Four Decades, Paul Kasmin Gallery, New York, 2015.
- Family Ties, Jeu de Paume, Paris, 2024/25

== Awards and Grants ==
- Lucie Award for Achievement in Portraiture in 2010
- John Simon Guggenheim Memorial Foundation, Artist's Fellowship in 1991
