= Johann Stegner =

German politician (1866–1954)

Johann Stegner (20 December 1866, Frohnlach, Saxe-Coburg and Gotha – 7 January 1954, Coburg, Bavaria, West Germany) was a German politician from the Social Democratic Party of Germany (SPD).

== Life ==
Johann Stegner, the son of a construction worker, was born on 20 December 1866 in Frohnlach, District of Sonnefeld, in the Duchy of Saxe-Coburg and Gotha but he was raised in Scheuerfeld, then a village west of Coburg, in the same Duchy. He was apprenticed as a brewer and then went for several years as a wandering journeyman. At first, he worked as a brewer until 1900, when he leased as an innkeeper a property. In 1909 he was a board member and full-time treasurer of the local consumer cooperative. There he worked until his retirement in 1932. In addition, he served from 1906 to 1917 as the chairman of the Gewerkschaftskartells [Workers Cartel] of Coburg. He died in Coburg, Bavaria, West Germany on 7 January 1954.

== Politics ==
Around 1890 Johann Stegner joined the Social Democratic Party of Germany, for which he ran for election to the Ducal Parliament of Saxe-Coburg and Gotha in 1908 and 1912. In November 1918 he was Chairman of the Workers Council of Coburg. He was chosen on 9 February 1919 as a deputy for the Social Democrats in the State Assembly of Coburg, where he was a member until the dissolution (because of the union of the Free State of Coburg with the Free State of Bavaria) on 30 June 1920. From 19 March 1920 until the election on 7 November 1920, initially in an advisory capacity, he represented the Coburger Land with Hermann Mämpel and Hans Woldemar Schack in the Landtag of Bavaria.

== Literature ==
- (in German) Klaus Freiherr von Andrian-Werburg: Die Zusammensetzung der coburgischen Volksvertretung bei der Vereinigung Coburgs mit Bayern [The Composition of the Representation of the Coburger People in the Union Between Coburg and Bavaria]. In: Jahrbuch der Coburger Landesstiftung 1969 [Yearbook of the Coburg State Foundation 1969].
