= Sonnefeld =

- Municipality
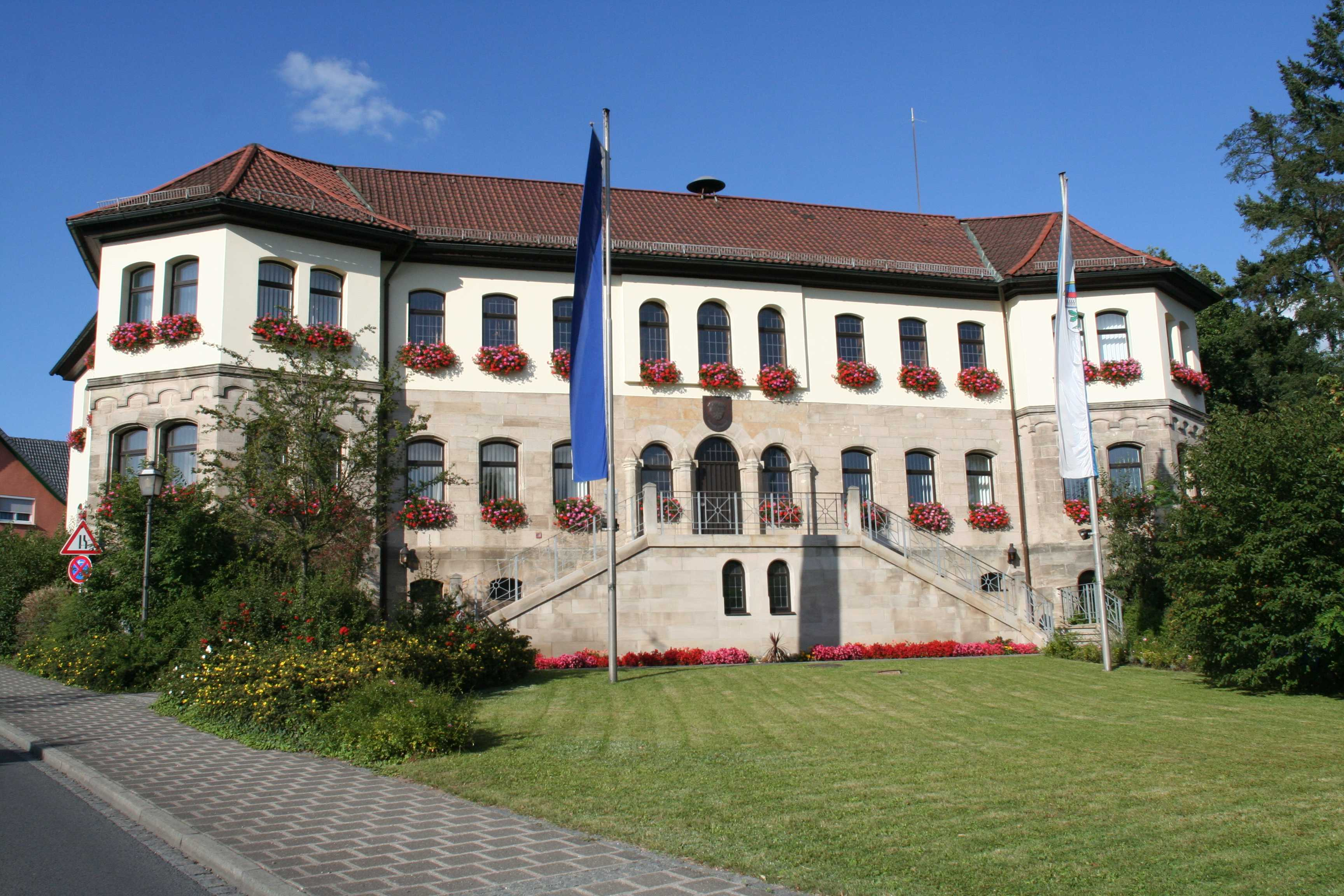
- Town hall

- Coat of arms

- Location of Sonnefeld within Coburg district
- Interactive map of Sonnefeld
- Location within Germany Location within Bavaria
- Coordinates: 50°13′N 11°7′E
- Country: Germany
- State: Bavaria
- Admin. region: Oberfranken
- District: Coburg

Government
  - Mayor (2020–26): Michael Keilich (CSU)

Area
  - Total: 34.69 km^{2} (13.39 sq mi)
- Elevation: 318 m (1,043 ft)

Population (2025-12-31)
  - Total: 4,422
  - Density: 127.5/km^{2} (330.2/sq mi)
- Time zone: UTC+01:00 (CET)
  - Summer (DST): UTC+02:00 (CEST)
- Postal codes: 96242
- Dialling codes: 09562
- Vehicle registration: CO
- Website: sonnefeld.de

Sonnefeld (German pronunciation: [ˈzɔnəfɛlt]) is a municipality in the district of Coburg in Bavaria in Germany.

== Geographical Location ==
Sonnefeld lies on Bundesstraße 303 between Coburg and Kronach and also between the Thuringian Forest and the Lichtenfels Forest.

== Municipal Division ==
The municipality of Sonnefeld is divided into eleven districts:

- Bieberbach
- Firmelsdorf
- Gestungshausen
- Hassenberg
- Neuses am Brand
- Oberwasungen
- Sonnefeld
- Weickenbach
- Weischau
- Wörlsdorf
- Zedersdorf

== History ==
The first documented mention of Sonnefeld was in the year 1252. In 1260, a Cistercian nunnery was founded in Ebersdorf bei Coburg by Henry II von Sonneberg with the help from the nuns from Maidbronn. Three years later, in 1263, the nearby hamlet of Hofstädten became the property of the nunnery. When it burned to the ground in 1287, a new abbey was built and consecrated in Hofstädten for the nuns. In 1299, the villages of Weidhausen and Trübenbach were given to Sonnefeld Abbey in an exchange of properties with Bamberg. A church was added between 1330 and 1349 in the High Gothic style and became the Klosterkirche (monastery church).

In 1526, the abbey was dissolved as a result of the Reformation. Since then, Sonnefeld has been an Evangelical Lutheran parish. The Thirty Years' War destroyed most of the houses and buildings in Sonnefeld and Hofstädten so the reconstruction was slow but steady. It got a big boost from the grant of market privileges by Duke Albert V, Duke of Saxe-Coburg. In 1705, the district of Sonnefeld came to the Duchy of Saxe-Hildburghausen. In 1769, the parish church was rebuilt. In 1826, the district of Sonnefeld was given to the Duchy of Saxe Coburg and Gotha in the redistribution of lands between the surviving Saxon duchies.

On 1 May 1851 the cantor Karl Herold founded a children's festival. On 23 June 1889 Sonnefeld and Hofstädten were merged as a single town under the name of Sonnefeld. In the same year, a war memorial was unveiled in the town square (Marktplatz), and the first railway line opened at Sonnefeld in 1901. During World War I, Sonnefeld had to surrender three church bells and the pipes of the church's organ to the war effort but they were replaced and dedicated in 1919 and 1924 respectively. On 1 June 1920, the dissolution of Saxe-Coburg and Gotha sent the district of Coburg, including Sonnefeld, to Bavaria. Before World War II, 1400 people were counted in Sonnefeld but in 1966 the population was down to 980 residents in 556 households. However, the subsequent additions, a total of 10 villages, to the municipality increased the population to 5,300.

== Coat of arms ==
Blazon: Per fess azure and argent (divided horizontally in blue and white, with the top in blue), in chief a church argent roofed gules (with a profile of a white church with red roofs) and in base an oak tree erased proper. (The church is the former abbey church of Sonnefeld and the oak is the traditional symbol of Hofstädten).

== Politics ==
The Town Council has 20 members. The municipal elections of 2008 led to the following distribution of the seats in the council: 8 seats for CSU, 7 seats for SPD, and 5 seats for Independents.

== Economy ==
Until the 19th Century, Sonnefeld was primarily an agricultural village. Then basketmaking became the main business of the village, with products exported all over the world. After the end of World War I, workshops were created to make willow chairs, wicker furniture, baby carriages, and upholstered furniture. They were the ones that eventually replaced basketmaking. They were joined by industrial jobs in nearby towns and villages in the post-World War II boom. The prosperity made it possible for Sonnefeld to add a water supply system, a fully biological sewage treatment plant, an elementary school with a gym, and a heated swimming pool.

== Other Facts ==
In Sonnefeld, Itzgründisch, an East Franconian German dialect of High German, is spoken.

== Notable residents ==
- Friedrich Geißhardt (1919 – 1943), a German former Luftwaffe fighter ace
- Georg Hansen (1904 - 1944), a German Army officer and a German Resistance fighter

== Literature ==
- (de) Wilhelm Volkert (ed.): Handbuch der bayerischen Ämter, Gemeinden und Gerichte 1799–1980 (Handbook of the Bavarian Administrations, Municipalities and Courts, 1799-1980). C.H.Beck’sche Verlagsbuchhandlung, Münich, 1983. ISBN 3-406-09669-7, pp. 441 and 442.
- (de) Statistisches Bundesamt (Federal Bureau of Statistics) (ed.), Historisches Gemeindeverzeichnis für die Bundesrepublik Deutschland. Namens-, Grenz- und Schlüsselnummernänderungen bei Gemeinden, Kreisen und Regierungsbezirken vom 27. 5. 1970 bis 31. 12. 1982 (Historical Directory of the Municipalities of the Federal Republic of Germany. Name, Boundary and Key Number Changes for Communities, Districts and Administrations between 27 May 1970 and 31 December 1982). W. Kohlhammer, Stuttgart and Mainz, 1983. ISBN 3-17-003263-1, p. 679.
