= Stephane Groueff =

- Born: May 22, 1922; Sofia, Bulgaria
- Died: May 2, 2006 (aged 83); Southampton, New York
- Education: University of Geneva
- Occupations: writer, journalist
- Spouse: Lillian Fox
- Children: son Paul Groueff; Jill Isles Blanchard (stepchild); Tina Isles Barney (stepchild); Philip Henry Isles II (stepchild)

Stephane Groueff (May 22, 1922 – May 2, 2006) was a writer, journalist and a political refugee, born in Sofia, Bulgaria.

== Biography ==
He was studying law in the University of Geneva when the communists seized power in his country in 1944. His father was Chief of Cabinet of King Boris III and was executed by the communists in 1945. Groueff lived in exile for 46 years: first in Switzerland and later in France and the US. He did not return to Bulgaria until 1990 after the collapse of the communist regime. He was a reporter for the "Paris-Match" magazine and after traveling extensively as a foreign correspondent, he became its New York Bureau chief for 20 years until 1978. He also worked for Radio Free Europe, was a contributor to the Bulgarian Service of BBC and was active in a few emigre organizations and publications in exile.

He was the first Bulgarian to visit Antarctica as a journalist and to have set foot on the South Pole; after Mario Anton Weller, MS-a Bulgarian American- who went to the Antarctic in 1971–1972 as chief of the expedition that installed there a satellite tracking station and antenna for the European Space Research Organization whose DG was Hermann Bondi (the project was led by Umberto Montalenti director of ESA's Operation Center). In 2002 the American University in Bulgaria, of which Stephane Groueff was one of the founding Board members, conferred on him the honorary degree Doctor of Humane Letters, and the President of the Republic of Bulgaria decorated him with the "Madara Horseman" order for "...his outstanding contribution to popularizing the Bulgarian culture the world over and promoting history science in Bulgaria and abroad." As a historian of the construction of the first atomic bomb, he was invited as a speaker at the 60th commemoration of the Manhattan Project in Washington D.C. and in Oak Ridge, Tennessee.

Groueff is the author of eight non-fiction books in French and English, three of which, Manhattan Project: The Untold Story of the Making of the Atomic Bomb, Crown of Thorns, and My Odyssey were translated in Bulgarian. His autobiographical work, My Odyssey, was published in 2002 in Bulgarian, and in 2003 in English. The book is dedicated to his late brother Simeon, who "chose the harder road and lived in Bulgaria until his last breath." The author adds: "My destiny was to have an unusually diverse and colorful life, with many rewards, professional and personal. My odyssey has also its sad stages, but as a whole it is a lucky and happy one."

== Personal life ==
In 1957, he married Lillian Fox, a fashion model of the 1940s who became an interior designer. She was previously married to Philip Henry Isles (1912–1989), grandson of Philip Lehman and member of the Lehman banking family. They had one child together, Paul Groueff, He also had three stepchildren from her first marriage: Jill Isles Blanchard, Tina Isles Barney, and Philip Henry Isles II (married to Alexandra Moltke).

Groueff became a naturalized American citizen and lived in the last years before his death at age 83 in Southampton, New York. His wife, Lil, died the next day) at the age of 89.
