= Sonnefeld Abbey =

Church building in Bavaria, Germany

Coordinates: 50°13′18″N 11°08′03″E

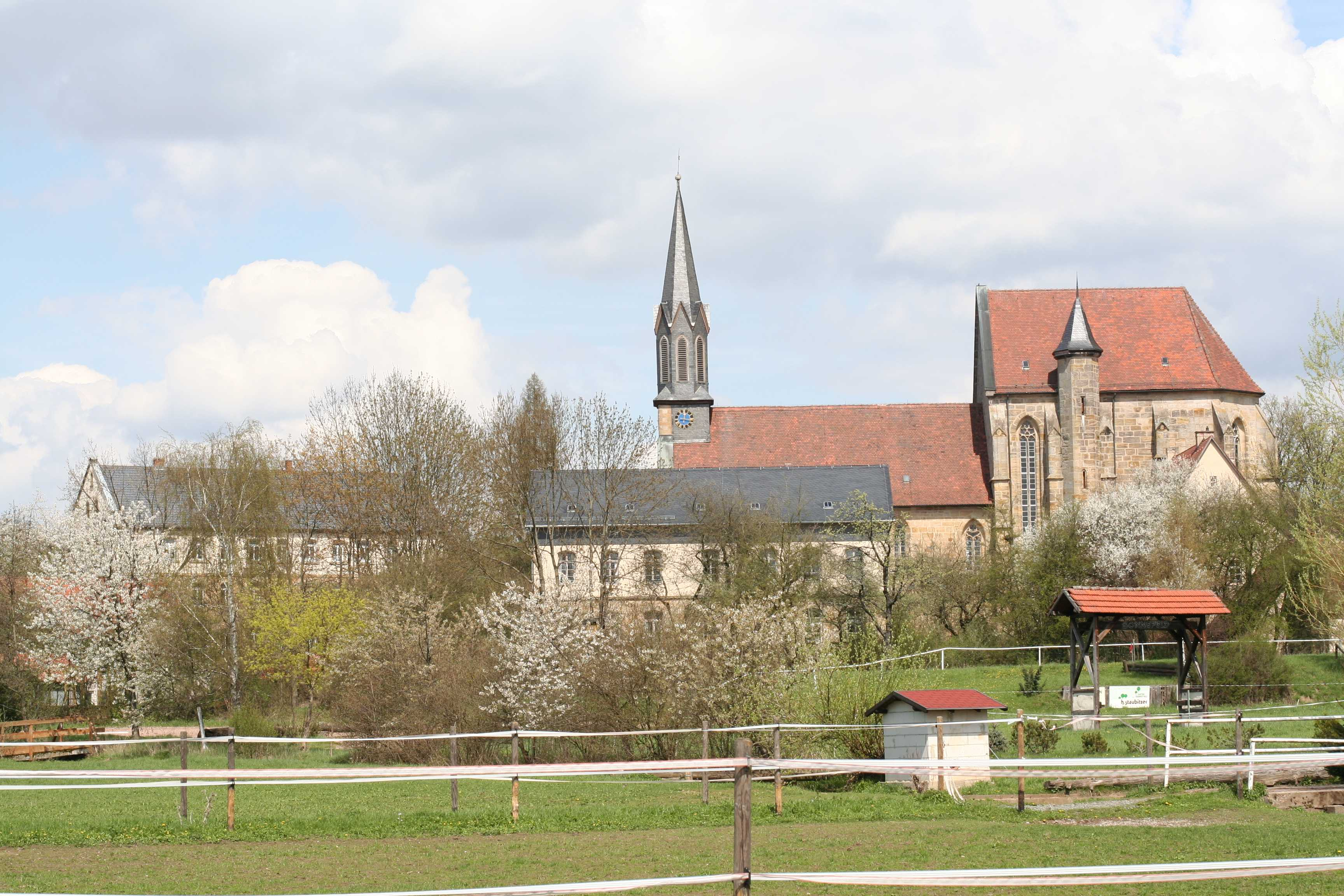
The abbey church, south side

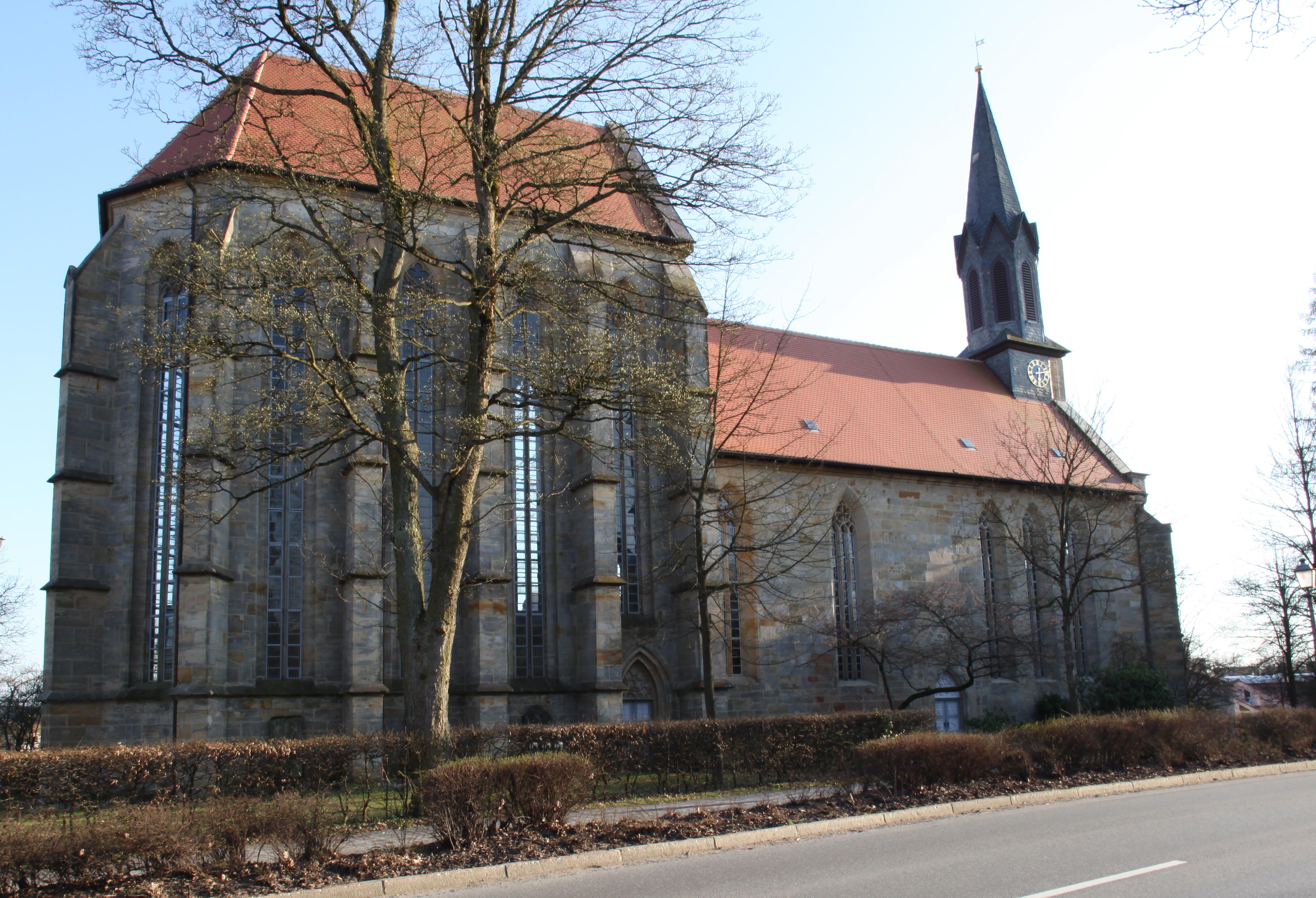
North side

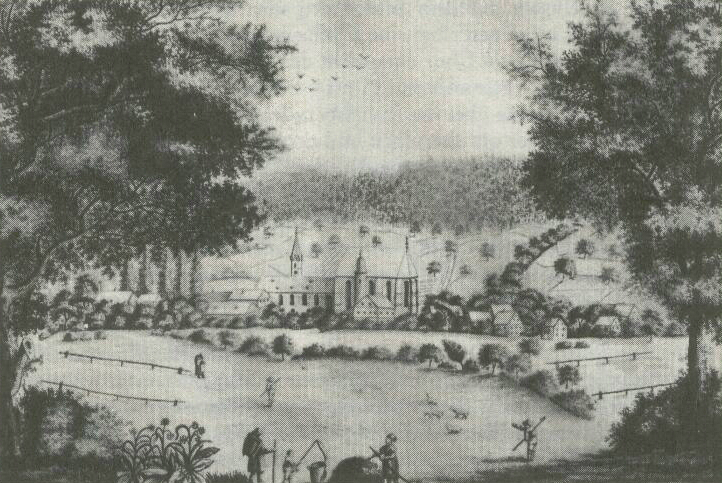
View from 1825 (drawing by Karl Koch)

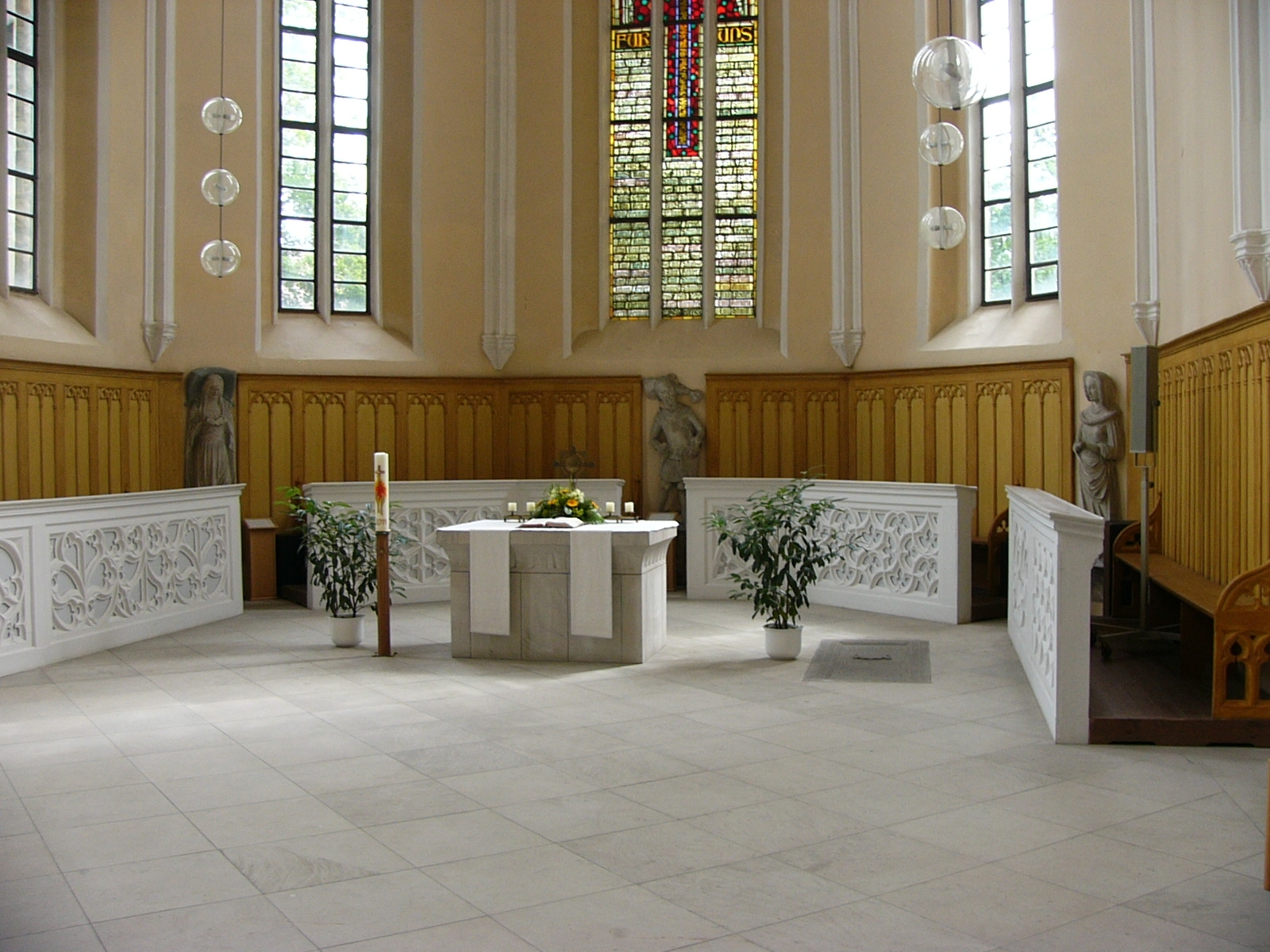
Choir

Sonnefeld Abbey (German: Kloster Sonnefeld; Latin: Campus Solis) is a former Cistercian nunnery in Sonnefeld in Bavaria, Germany. The former abbey church, or Klosterkirche, is now an Evangelical Lutheran parish church.

== History ==
=== Foundation ===
The nunnery, dedicated to the Blessed Virgin Mary, was founded in 1260 by Henry II von Sonneberg and his wife Kunigunde. Initially it was located in Ebersdorf bei Coburg but after a fire in 1287 it was moved to Hofstädten, where the abbey with its surrounding settlement and district adopted the name "Sonnefeld". (In 1889 Sonnefeld and Hofstädten merged to become the present municipality of Sonnefeld). The landowner was the Prince-Bishop of Bamberg, Berthold of Leiningen, who was trying by means of the monastic foundation to stop the territorial advances of the Counts of Henneberg. The spiritual leader was the Bishop of Würzburg. The settlement was made by nuns from Maidbronn Abbey. The endowment included the nearby villages of Frohnlach and Ebersdorf. In 1262, the abbots of Ebrach and Bildhausen inspected progress and arranged for recognition by the Cistercian Order.

=== Development ===
The abbey gradually fell under the influence of the Hennebergs. Under Abbess Anna von Henneberg, who died in about 1363 and whose epitaph and funerary monument have been preserved, it saw a brief flourishing. The 14th century however also saw a decline. The number of nuns had risen beyond the economic limits of the nunnery and had to be restricted to 50. The provisions for the unmarried daughters and widows of nobles and wealthy townspeople soon became the focus of the life of the community. Private property became common, contrary to the rules of the order, while the number of lay servants decreased. Under Abbess Margaretha von Brandenstein (c. 1460–1503), the abbey saw a last short period of prosperity, because the abbess succeeded in paying off the nunnery's debts and began several construction projects. In 1504, most of the nuns turned against the next abbess, because she wanted to reintroduce claustration, supported by the abbot of Georgenthal Abbey, who was appointed Visitor and forced some of the nuns to be enclosed.

=== Possessions ===
Beginning with the former episcopal Bamberg estates of Sonnefeld, Frohnlach and Ebersdorf, the abbey increased its possessions with other properties from the bishopric of Bamberg, and the Benedictine Banz Abbey and Saalfeld Abbey. A papal letter of protection of 1291 named 34 localities. By the end of the Middle Ages the abbey had grown into one of the largest landowners in the Coburger Land. The property book or feodary of 1514 notes abbey properties in 77 locations. An almost entirely enclosed lordship developed around Sonnefeld. There were also endowments from local noble families, especially the von Schaumbergs and the Marschälle von Kunstadt. From 1331 the abbey had a right of residence in a house in Bamberg and owned several houses in Coburg. Through Abbess Anna von Henneberg the abbey gained possession of vineyards in Nassach (Aidhausen) and in Nüdlingen.

=== Dissolution ===
In 1524, against the will of the last abbess, Margaretha von Zedtwitz, the nuns insisted on a Lutheran preacher. A year later, when the abbess died, the officials of John, Elector of Saxony, appointed an administrator over the abbey's property. Of the 14 nuns, five left for a life in the world; of those who remained, the last died in 1572. The abbey's territory passed into the hands of the rulers of Coburg. A few decades later, Anna of Saxony spent several years of her captivity in the former nunnery and after she died in 1613 was brought back here for burial in the church.

=== Abbesses ===
1. Agnes, (presumably) von Sonneberg, 1264
2. Irmengardis, (presumably) von Sonneberg, 1276
3. Jutta von Meissen, 1287–1289
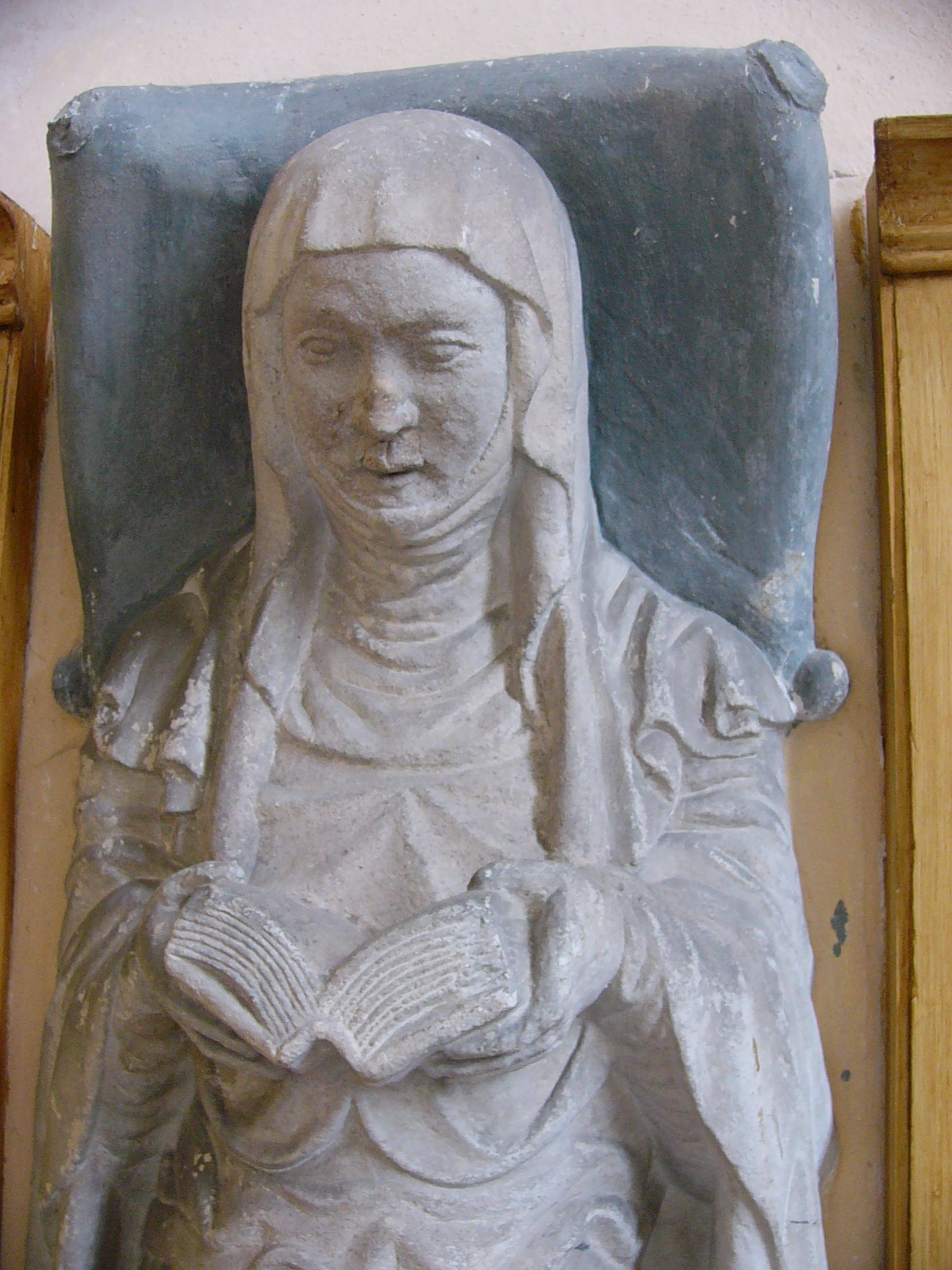
  Monument of Anna von Henneberg
4. Elisabeth von Henneberg, 1296
5. Mechtildis von Sonneberg from Lichtenfels, 1302–1303
6. Jutta II von Henneberg-Coburg, 1304
7. Agnes II, (presumably) von Sonneberg, 1305
8. Mechtildis II from Lichtenfels, 1305
9. Agnes III, (presumably) von Sonneberg, 1306 (possibly identical with Agnes II)
10. Jutta III von Henneberg from Lusatia, 1306–1325
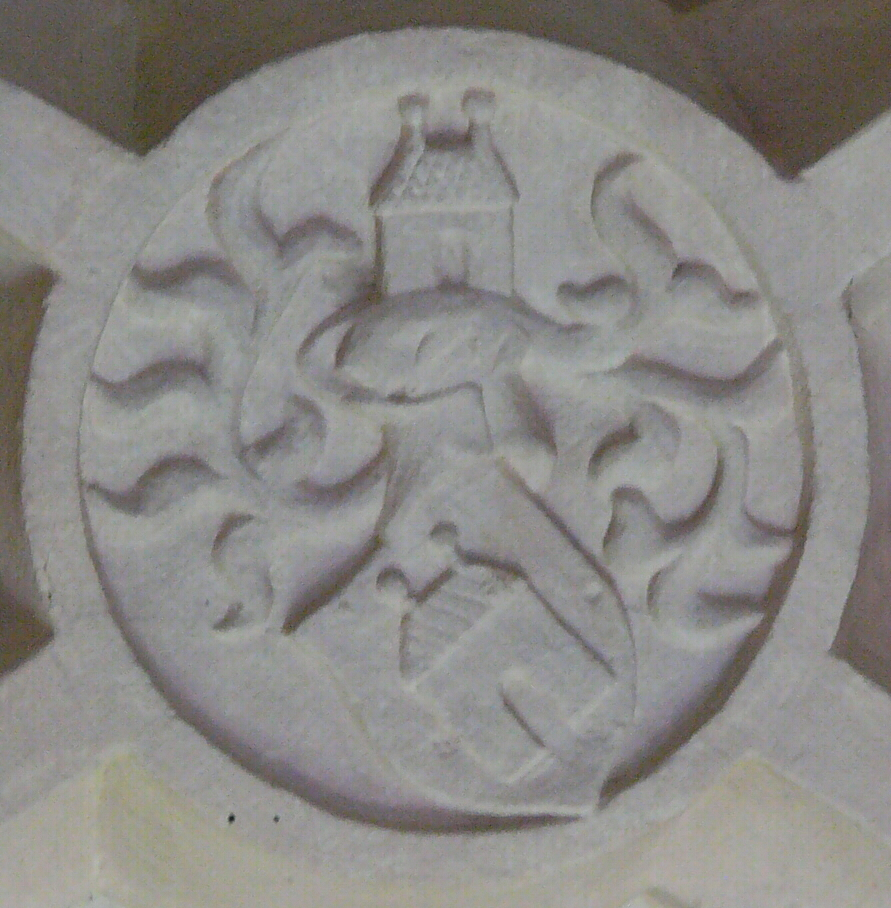
  Arms of Dorothea von Kemmaten on keystone
11. Sophia, 1328
12. Margaretha, 1329–1334
13. Ottilia, 1334
14. Margaretha II Marschalk, 1335–1344
15. Ottilia II Truchsess, 1345–1351
16. Adelheidis Marschalk, 1354–1360
17. Felicitas, 1362–1363
18. Anna von Henneberg, died circa 1363
19. Margaretha III von Heldritt, 1364–1375
20. Elisabeth II von Lichtenstein, 1379–1386
21. Anna Marschalk, 1390–1396
22. Barbara von Smeheim, 1398
23. Katharina von Füllbach, 1401–1406
24. Dorothea von Gotlecher, 1408
25. Katharina II von Füllbach, 1409–1419 (probably identical with Katharina I)
26. Barbara II von Walsberg, 1425–1430
27. Margaretha IV von Giech, 1433–1437
28. Elisabeth III, 1441–1448
29. Dorothea II von Kemmaten, 1454–1455 (her arms are on the keystone)
30. Margaretha V von Brandenstein, 1462–1503
31. Dorothea von Pfersfeld, 1503–1515
32. Margaretha von Zedtwitz, died 1525

== Buildings ==
The church was built, according to the custom of the Cistercians, with a ground-level vault next to the choir and nave, which supported the nuns' gallery (Nonnenempore). The choir area was the work of Heinrich Parler but its character was partially lost because of fires and renovations. Among other things, the roof turret, a Parler trademark, was removed. Only a few gravestones have survived from the time of the nunnery: the monuments of Abbess Anna von Henneberg and of knights of the von Schaumberg family. The abbey church became the parish church for the Protestants in 1540. The previous parish church is the present graveyard chapel.

In 1634 the abbey and church burned to the ground. In 1856, they were restored. Of the monastic buildings only a part of the east wing is preserved. A keystone in the arch bears the arms of Abbess Dorothea von Kemmaten (circa 1453). The remains of paintings from the second half of the 15th century can still be seen.

The entire monastery area consisted of several buildings, which were surrounded by a moat. The buildings, besides the residential ones, were used mostly for agriculture and administration, including a mill. The buildings also included a district office, a Fronfeste (fortified tower) and a school.

== Literature ==
- Harald Bachmann: Sonnefeld - Geschichte und Gegenwart. Sonnefeld, no date
- Joachim Hotz: Zisterzienserklöster in Oberfranken in: Große Kunstführer Bd. 98, Munich and Zurich: Schnell und Steiner, 1982, ISBN 3-7954-0842-3, pp. 64–70.
- Walter Lorenz et al.: 700 Jahre Sonnefeld 1252 - 1952. Coburg: Veste-Verlag, 1952
- Hans Roser: Klöster in Franken. Freiburg: Eulen Verlag, 1988, ISBN 3-89102-108-9, p. 224 ff
- Hermann Wank: Markt und Kloster Sonnefeld. Coburg, 1925
