= Robert Lehman =

American banker

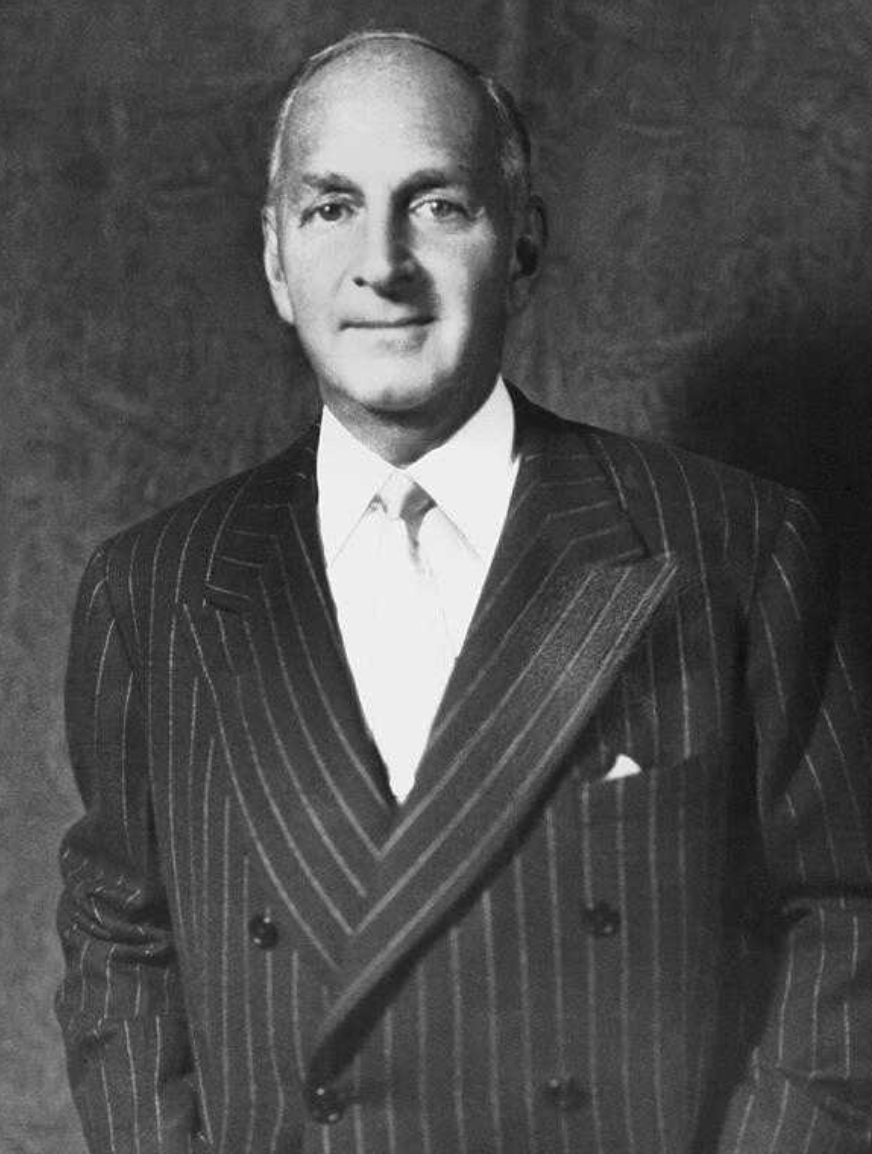
- Born: Robert Lehman; September 29, 1891; New York City
- Died: August 9, 1969 (aged 77)
- Education: Hotchkiss School (1908); Yale University (1913)
- Occupation: Banker
- Known for: CEO of Lehman Brothers
- Spouses: Ruth S. Lamar Rumsey (divorced); Ruth Leavitt Meeker; Lee Anz Lynn
- Children: with Meeker: Robert Owen ("Robin") Lehman
- Parents: Philip Lehman; Carrie Lauer Lehman
- Family: Lehman family

Robert Lehman (September 29, 1891 – August 9, 1969) was an American banker, longtime head of the Lehman Brothers investment bank, and a racehorse owner, art collector, and philanthropist.

== Life and career ==
Lehman was born to a Jewish family in New York City. He was the son of Philip Lehman (1861–1947) and grandson of Emanuel Lehman, a cofounder of Lehman Brothers investment bank, and Carrie Lauer (1865–1937).

He graduated from Hotchkiss School in 1908 and was a 1913 graduate of Yale University, where he was a member of Delta Kappa Epsilon fraternity (Phi chapter). When his father retired in 1925, "Bobbie" Lehman assumed the leadership role of the family-owned business. He took over the bank during a time when Lehman Brothers, like its competitors Goldman Sachs and Morgan Stanley, was essentially a one-office firm.

While sound financial principles were essential, Robert Lehman was often quoted as saying that he "bet on people." One of those people he believed in was Juan Trippe who would build Pan American World Airways into an industry powerhouse. Robert Lehman understood that to maximize Lehman Brothers' growth he needed additional investor capital. While still maintaining voting control, he was the first to invite non-family members to become partners. He understood too that the right partners could expand the company's opportunities through interlocking directorships. As such, he sold an interest in Lehman Brothers to John D. Hertz who had sold his Yellow Cab Company and The Hertz Corporation for a fortune and who sat on the board of directors of General Motors. Under Robert Lehman, the bank concentrated on rapidly developing consumer industries with financing deals arranged in retailing, airlines, and the entertainment business notably with the Keith-Albee-Orpheum theatre group 1928 deal that sold the majority of its stock to Joseph P. Kennedy which led to the creation of RKO motion picture studios. And, when Lehman put together start-up financing for Paramount Pictures, John D. Hertz would be their connection on Paramount's board.

Robert Lehman guided his company through the perils of the stock-market crash of 1929 and the ensuing Great Depression of the 1930s. Post-war, he grew the company substantially, expanding to Paris, France, to meet the financial needs of his clients with international operations. In the process, he made himself one of the wealthiest people in the United States.

== Thoroughbred horses ==
A lover of horses and a polo enthusiast, Robert Lehman played on a polo team with W. Averell Harriman, Jock Whitney and Tommy Hitchcock, Jr. He was also a thoroughbred racehorse owner and breeder who had five horses compete in the Kentucky Derby. His horses, most trained by Ralph G. Kercheval, won numerous important stakes races including the Correction Handicap and the Long Island Handicap at Aqueduct Racetrack, and the Bernard Baruch Handicap at Saratoga Race Course.

== Art collection ==
For six decades, Lehman built upon an art collection that his father began at their 7 West 54th Street house in 1911. Lehman devoted a great deal of time and energy as a long-time member of the Board of Trustees of the Metropolitan Museum of Art, and finally becoming the first chairman of the board at the Metropolitan in the 1960s. The importance of his collection became such that in 1957, nearly three hundred works were used for a solo exhibition at the Louvre Museum's Musée de l'Orangerie in the Tuileries Gardens in Paris. At that time, his was the only private American collection to be given that honor. In 1968 he received an honorary Doctor of Humane Letters from Yale University for having "enhanced the civic life, the culture, and the artistic development of our civilization."

After his death in 1969, the Robert Lehman Foundation donated close to 3,000 works of art to the Metropolitan Museum of Art, including Henri Matisse, Francisco Goya, Henri de Toulouse-Lautrec, Édouard Vuillard, Auguste Rodin, André Dunoyer de Segonzac, Maurice de Vlaminck, and Suzanne Valadon. Housed in the Robert Lehman Wing, which opened to the public in 1975, the museum has called it "one of the most extraordinary private art collections ever assembled in the United States." To this day, the foundation remains active, operating the Robert Lehman Art Lecture Fund and sponsoring exhibitions in museums, both around the U.S. and worldwide. The foundation also provides funding and support for PBS television programming. The Robert Lehman Art Center at Brooks School in North Andover, Massachusetts, is named in his honor.

== Personal life ==
Robert's first marriage—to Ruth S. (née Lamar) Rumsey (born 1902) in May 1929 in Montreal, Quebec—ended in a divorce about 1931. Previous to her marriage to Robert, Ruth Lamar had been married to John Williams "Jack" Rumsey (1877–1960), who was owner of the Embassy Club (a nightclub in New York City) and president of the American Play Company (an old established literary agency located at 532 Fifth Avenue in Manhattan).

Robert's second marriage, which occurred on June 25, 1934, in Washington, D.C., was to Ruth "Kitty" (Leavitt) Meeker (1904–1984), daughter of William Homer Leavitt and Ruth Bryan Owen, and granddaughter of United States Secretary of State, William Jennings Bryan. They had one son, cinematographer and director, Robert Owen ("Robin") Lehman. Meeker had three daughters from her first marriage to William Painter Meeker (1902–1983) whom she divorced in 1933: Ruth Meeker, Helen Meeker, and Kathrine Meeker. Robert and Ruth Meeker's marriage also ended in divorce in 1951.

Robert's third marriage—to Lee "Elena" (Anz) Lynn (1919–2006)—occurred on July 10, 1952, in New York.

He died August 9, 1969, and is interred in Woodlawn Cemetery in the Bronx, New York City.
