= Von Pfersfeld =

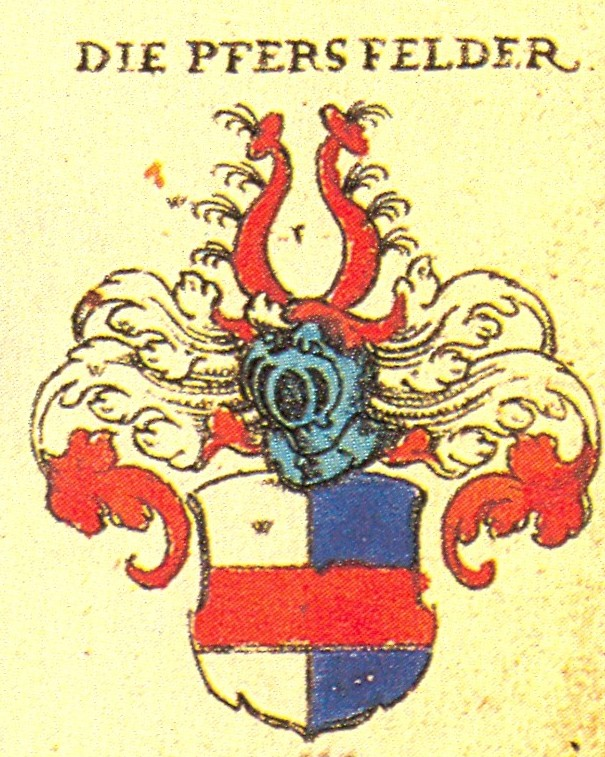
Coat-of-arms from the Siebmachers Wappenbuch

The Pfersfeld family, also known as Pfersfelder, was one of the oldest families of German nobility in Franconia, Germany.

== History ==
The Pfersfelder clan probably originated as a branch of the family of Groß (German for "Major", a step below Knight) von Trockau, and related to another branch of the same family, Lochner, because all their coats-of-arms are very similar.

According to Dr. Bernard Peters, von Pfersfeld was mentioned for the first time in 1307 so it is one of the oldest noble families of Franconia. Its seat is Pfersfeld, near Bad Staffelstein, a village between Staffelberg and Veitsberg, in Landkreis Lichtenfels, a part of the area called "Eden in the Upper Main Valley" [Gottesgarten am Obermaintal]. Three noble families, Groß von Trockau, Lochner of Hüttenbach and Christanz / Christans, were all founded by senior field servants [Schüsselfelder Dienstleute] of the von Pfersfeld family. Because of their association with the local nobility, the Pfersfelders were sometimes called Großen.

The von Pfersfelders had at least two notable members. One of them, Hartung Pfersfelder, was the Abbot of the St. Emmeram's Abbey, a Benedictine cloister in Regensberg, Bavaria, for five years (1452–1458). The other, Dorothea Pfersfelder, was the Abbess of the Monastery of Sonnefeld for twelve years (1503–1515).

The family is believed to have died out in the 17th century, perhaps, as suggested by Schöler, in 1628.

== Coat of arms ==
The shield is divided vertically in silver and blue and covered with an horizontal red bar. On the helmet are the two buffalo horns with egret feathers. The helmet's mantle is silver and red.
