= Maidbronn Abbey =

Nunnery in Bavaria, Germany

Coordinates: 49°50′2″N 9°58′33″E

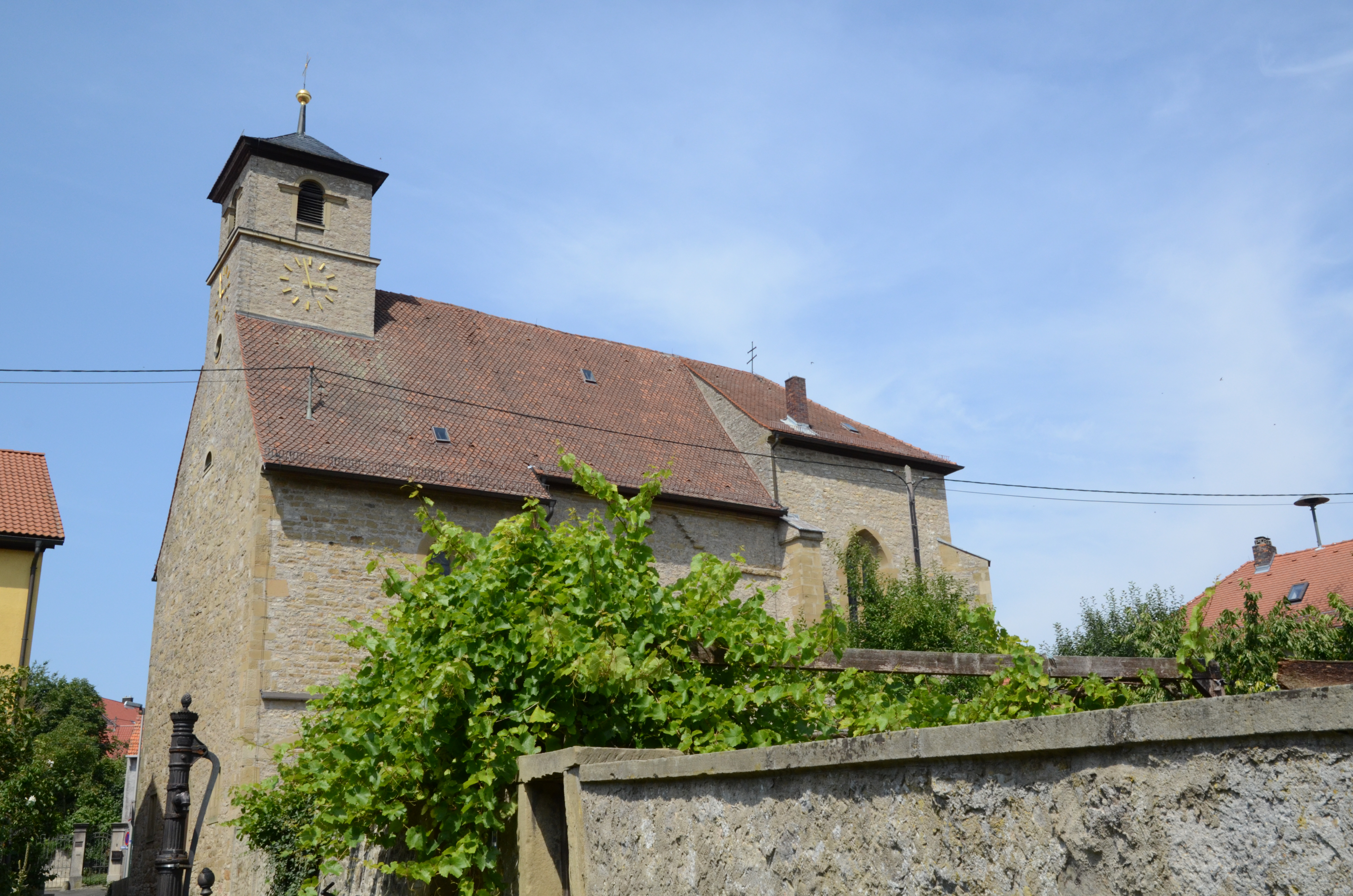
Former abbey church

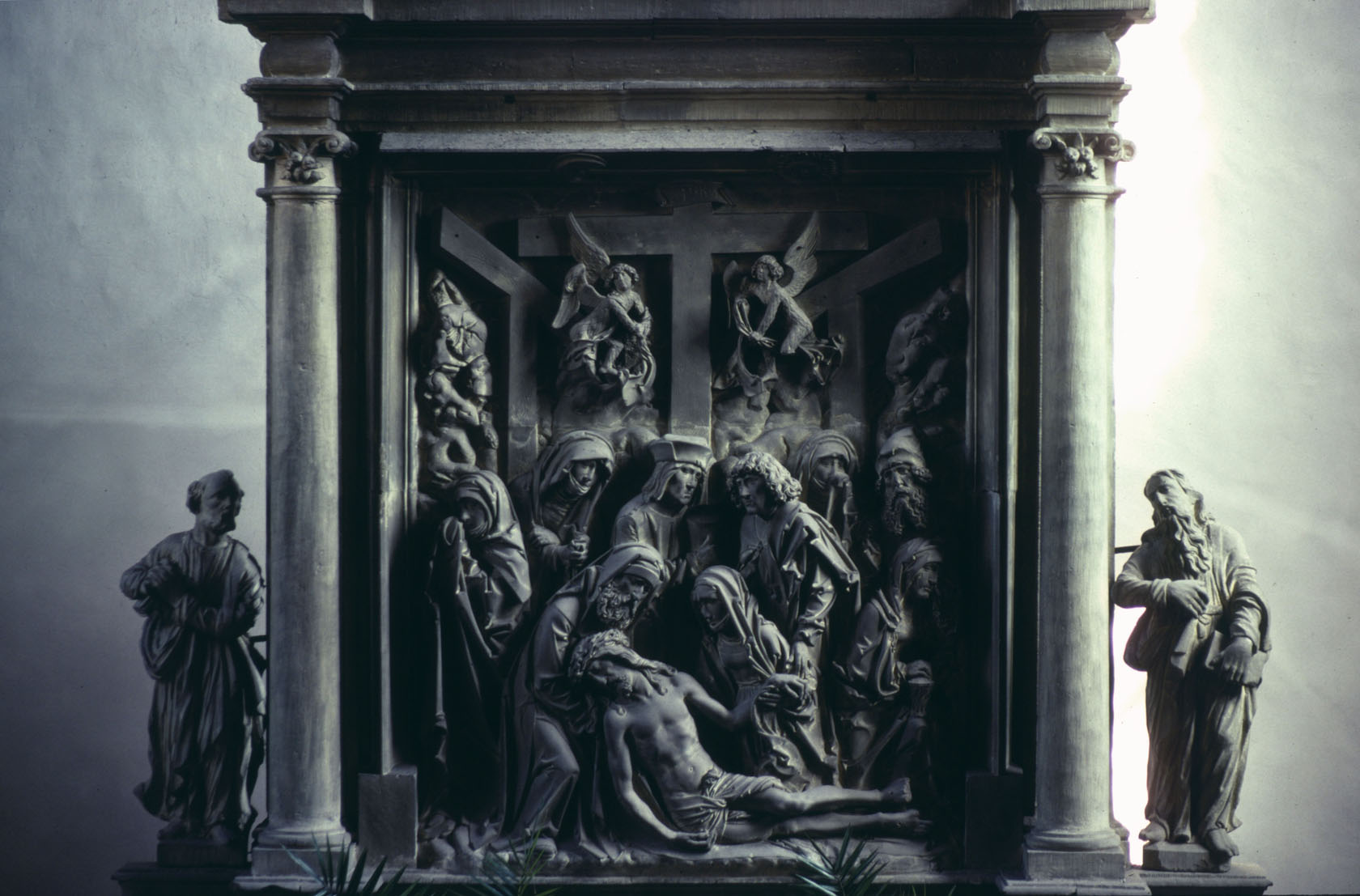
Lamentation of Christ: altarpiece by Tilman Riemenschneider

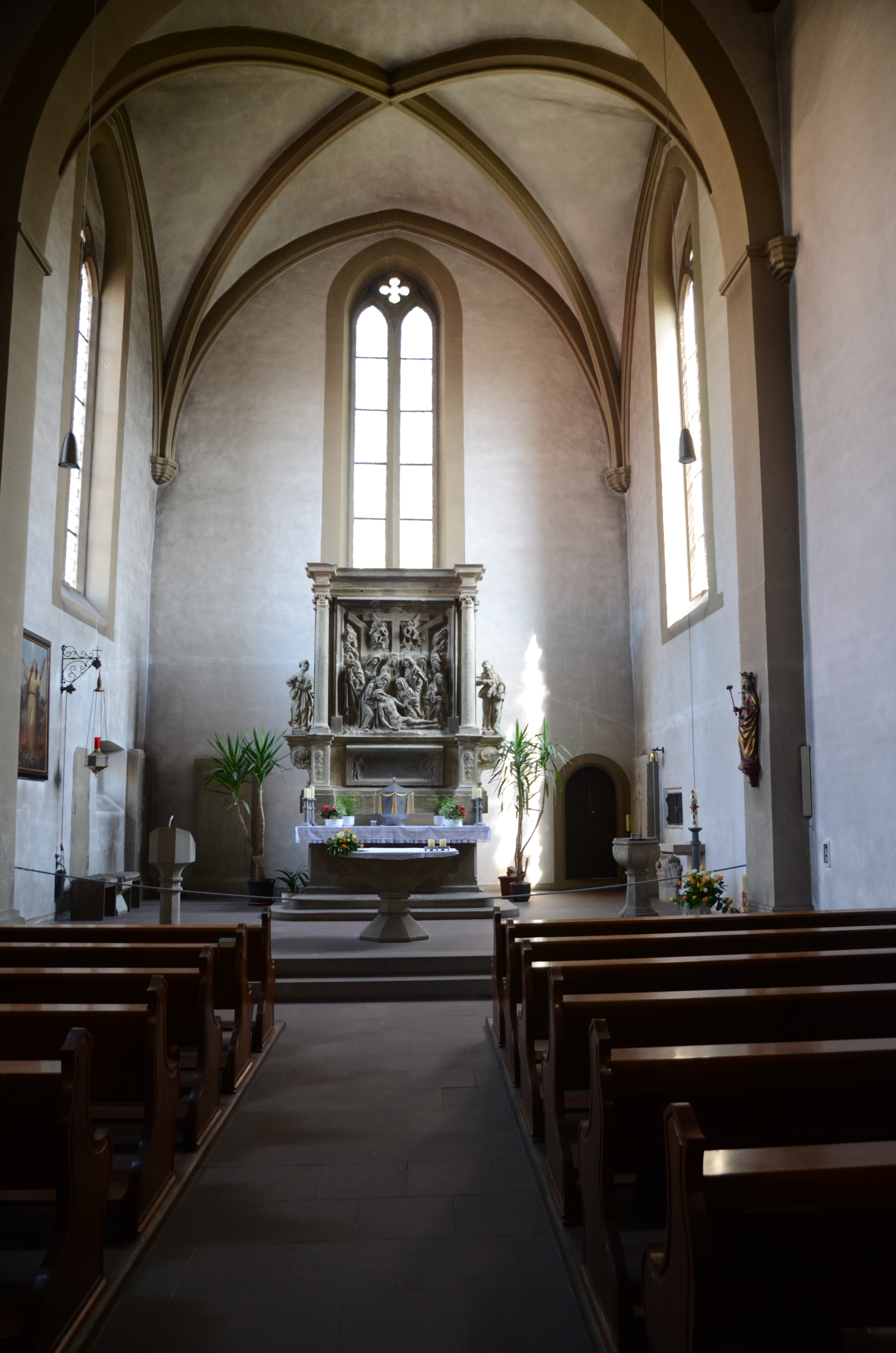
Church interior

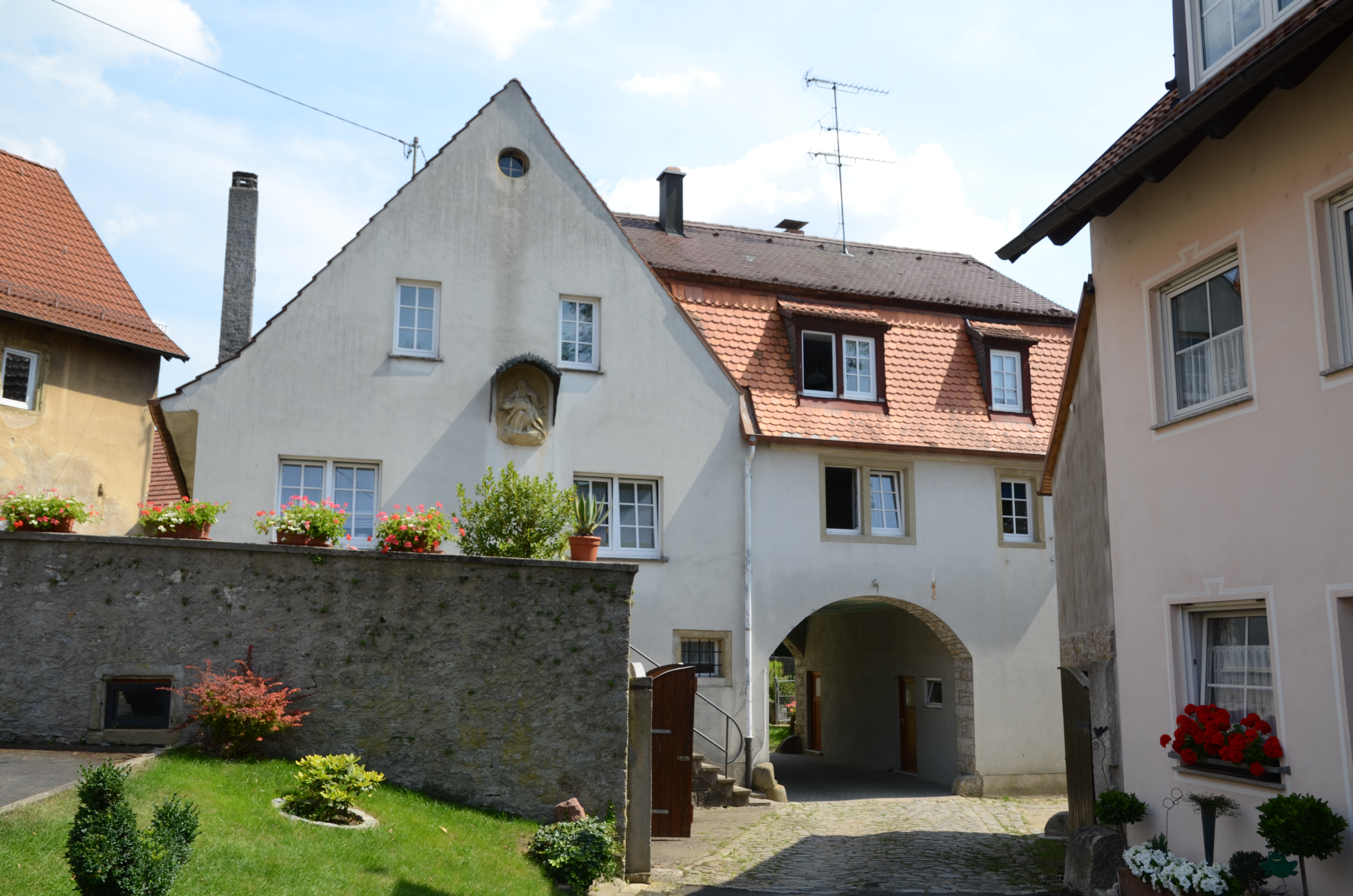
Former west wing of the conventual buildings, now private houses

Maidbronn Abbey (German: Kloster Maidbronn; Latin: Fons Virginis Sanctae Mariae) was a Cistercian nunnery in Maidbronn in the present municipality of Rimpar in Bavaria, Germany.

It was founded in 1232 by the Bishop of Würzburg in Bergerbrunn (now Rotkreuzhof in Dürrbachtal) but moved after three years to Etzelnhausen, renamed Maidbronn. The spiritual director was the abbot of Ebrach, later the abbot of Langheim.

By the 1260s the abbey was flourishing to the extent that it was able to send a contingent of nuns to establish the newly-founded Sonnefeld Abbey. During the rest of the 13th century the building of the church was completed.

From the 14th century onwards the abbey was in steady decline, caused mainly by its chronic financial difficulties. In 1513 it was taken over as a priory by Langheim Abbey; the four nuns still in residence were allowed to remain, although they were forced to flee in the Peasants' War in 1525. It was eventually dissolved in 1581.

Some of the conventual buildings survive converted into private houses. The former abbey church, dedicated to Saint Afra, although reduced to about half of its original length, continues in use as the parish church of Maidbronn. The church did not undergo the elaborate Baroque restoration usual in Bavaria and remains a simple building, distinguished by the altarpiece of the Lamentation of Christ by Tilman Riemenschneider, dated to 1525.
