= Buch am Forst =

- Ortsteil of Lichtenfels
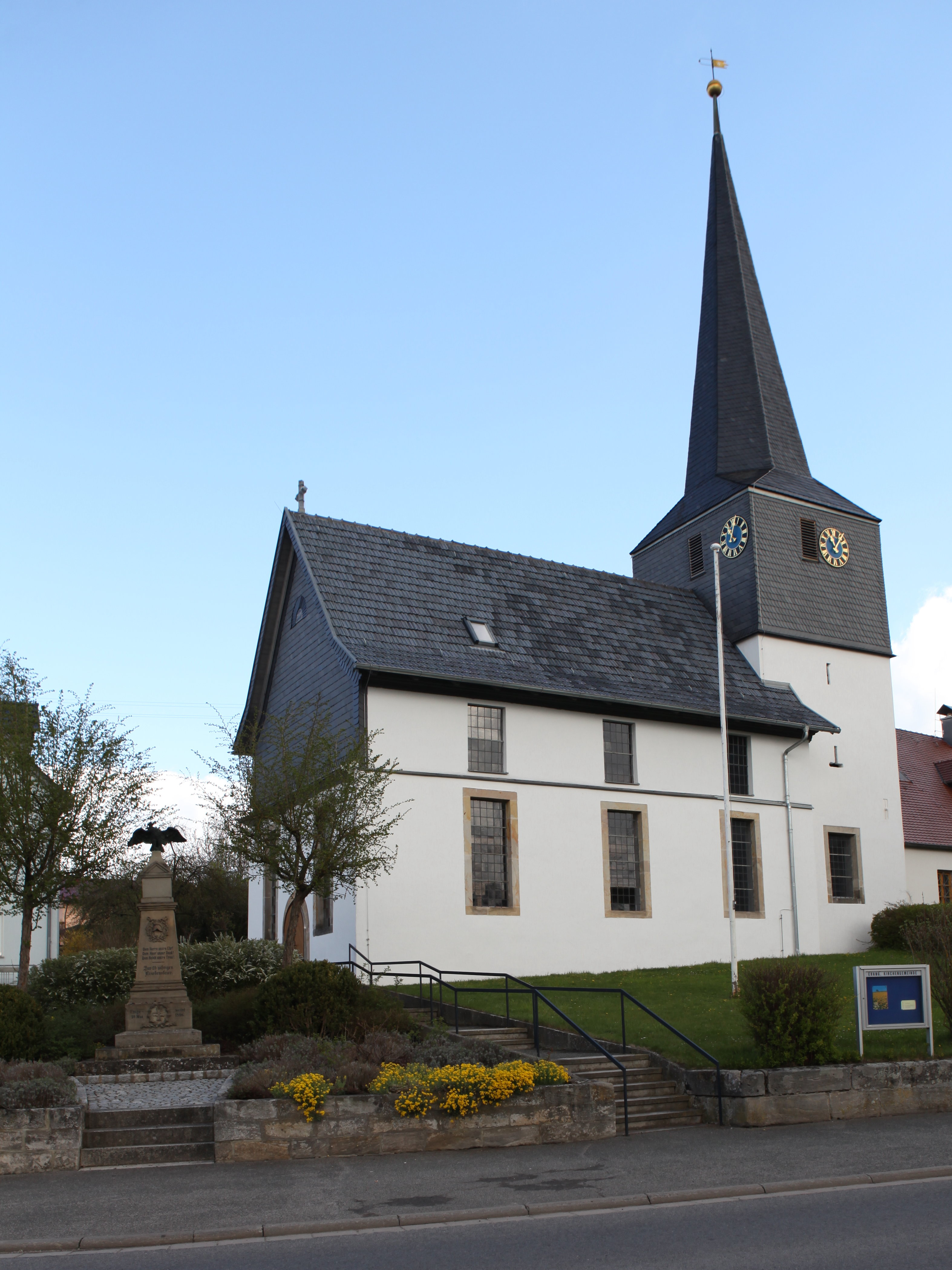
- St. Maria Magdalena Evangelical Lutheran Church
- Interactive map of Buch am Forst
- Location within Germany Location within Bavaria
- Coordinates: 50°09′N 11°44′E
- Country: Germany
- State: Bavaria
- Admin. region: Oberfranken
- District: Lichtenfels
- Town: Lichtenfels
- Elevation: 334 m (1,096 ft)

Population (2021)
  - Total: 530
- Time zone: UTC+01:00 (CET)
  - Summer (DST): UTC+02:00 (CEST)
- Postal codes: 96215
- Dialling codes: 09571
- Vehicle registration: LIF

Buch am Forst (German pronunciation: [ˈbuːx ʔam ˈfɔʁst], lit. 'Buch at the Forest') is a village of 530 inhabitants (1 September 2021) in the district town (Kreisstadt) of Lichtenfels in the state of Bavaria in Germany. It is 6 kilometers (3.7 miles) northwest of Lichtenfels and at the western edge of the Lichtenfels Forest (Lichtenfelser Forst). Bundesautobahn 73 [Federal Highway] runs approximately a half-mile (1 km) to the east, while Kreisstraße [District Road] LIF27 goes through the village itself.

== History ==
The first recorded mention of Buch am Forst was in 1215, when its name was spelled as Buoch. At that time, it was a part of the joint inheritance (Ganerbschaft) of the Banz Abbey, the district of Lichtenfels of the Bishopric of Bamberg and the senior line of the von Redwitz family. In 1225 Hermann von Arnstein donated to the Banz Abbey a property in Buch, previously owned by Hugo von Merzebach, and a place, where the Gutenfels Castle was built. But the village still belonged partly to the Prince-Bishopric of Bamberg and partly to the Saxon Duchies until the end of the Holy Roman Empire. On 21 August 1811 the Duchy of Saxe-Coburg and Gotha handed Buch am Forst completely over to the Kingdom of Bavaria. The kingdom then assigned Buch am Forst to the Mainkreis [District of the Main River], which later became Obermainkreis [District of the Upper Main River] in 1817 and then Oberfranken (Upper Franconia) in 1838. Until the end of World War I, Buch am Forst sat on the border between Saxe-Coburg and Bavaria and served as the customs office for Bavaria. It also had a Forestry Office for the nearby Forest of Lichtenfels. In 1818, it merged with the hamlets of Hammer, Seehof and Forsthub to form a single municipality. Throughout the 1830s, it had a manor, a brewery and 2 mills as well as the customs and forestry offices. By 1912, it had gained a post office but the nearest train station was 2.5 miles (4 km) away at Scherneck-Siemau at Itz Valley Railway.

Buch am Forst had 325 residents in 1818, 290 residents in 1831, 300 residents in 1840, 629 residents in 1898, 608 residents in 1912, 802 residents in 1950, 777 residents in 1961, 702 residents in 1970 and 557 residents in 2009.

On 1 January 1978 Buch am Forst merged with the city of Lichtenfels.

== Religion ==
Buch am Forst became Evangelical Lutheran in 1528 but it did not get its own parish until 1535. The name of its parish church is St. Mary Magdalene (German: Maria Magdalena). Its present building was built in 1680. Its interior is decorated with ornate wooden galleries and a dark brown coffered ceiling. A painting of the Twelve Apostles, with Jesus in the middle, hangs above the altar.

== Regular events ==
- Arbor Festival [Pflanzkirchweih] in the first weekend of July
- Church Fair [Kirchweih] on the third Sunday of July

== Economy ==
Buch am Forst has two restaurants, a hairdresser, a bakery, grocers, two butchers and a nursery.
