= Henry Lehman =

American banker (1822–1855)

- Born: Hayum Lehmann; September 29, 1822; Rimpar, Kingdom of Bavaria
- Died: November 17, 1855 (aged 33); New Orleans, Louisiana, United States
- Other name: Hayum Lehmann
- Occupation: Merchant
- Known for: co-founder of Lehman Brothers
- Spouse: Rosa Wolf
- Children: 4
- Relatives: Lehman family

Henry Lehman (born Hayum Lehmann; September 29, 1822 – November 17, 1855) was a German-born American businessman and the founder of Lehman Brothers, which grew from a cotton and fabrics shop during his life to become a large finance firm under his brothers' descendants.

== Life and work ==
Lehman was born under the name of Hayum Lehmann to a Jewish family, the son of Eva (Rosenheim) and Abraham Lehmann, a cattle merchant in the small Franconian town of Rimpar near Würzburg. Lehman emigrated to the United States in 1844, where he changed his name to Henry Lehman. He settled in Montgomery, Alabama, and opened a dry goods store named, "H. Lehman". In 1847, following the arrival of his younger brother Emanuel Lehman, the firm became, "H. Lehman and Bro." With the 1850 arrival of Mayer Lehman, the youngest brother, the firm became "Lehman Brothers".

In those years, cotton was the most important crop of the Southern United States. Capitalizing on cotton's extremely high market value around the world, the Lehman brothers became cotton factors, accepting cotton bales from customers as payment for their merchandise. They eventually began a second business as traders in cotton. The company directly dealt with cotton farmers. Lehman, particularly, presented himself as a friend to the farmers, who believed that the banks only lend money to merchants and middlemen. He bartered with skills that he learned from dealing with farmers in the Bavarian countryside and accepted cotton as payment for borrowed money. Within a few years, this became the major part of their firm. It was described as a very prosperous venture, running a very successful warehouse.

In 1855, Henry Lehman died from yellow fever while travelling in New Orleans. Later, his brothers moved the company's headquarters to New York City, eventually building it into an important American investment bank, which was in operation for over 150 years until its September 15, 2008, collapse.
