= Füllbach =

River in Germany

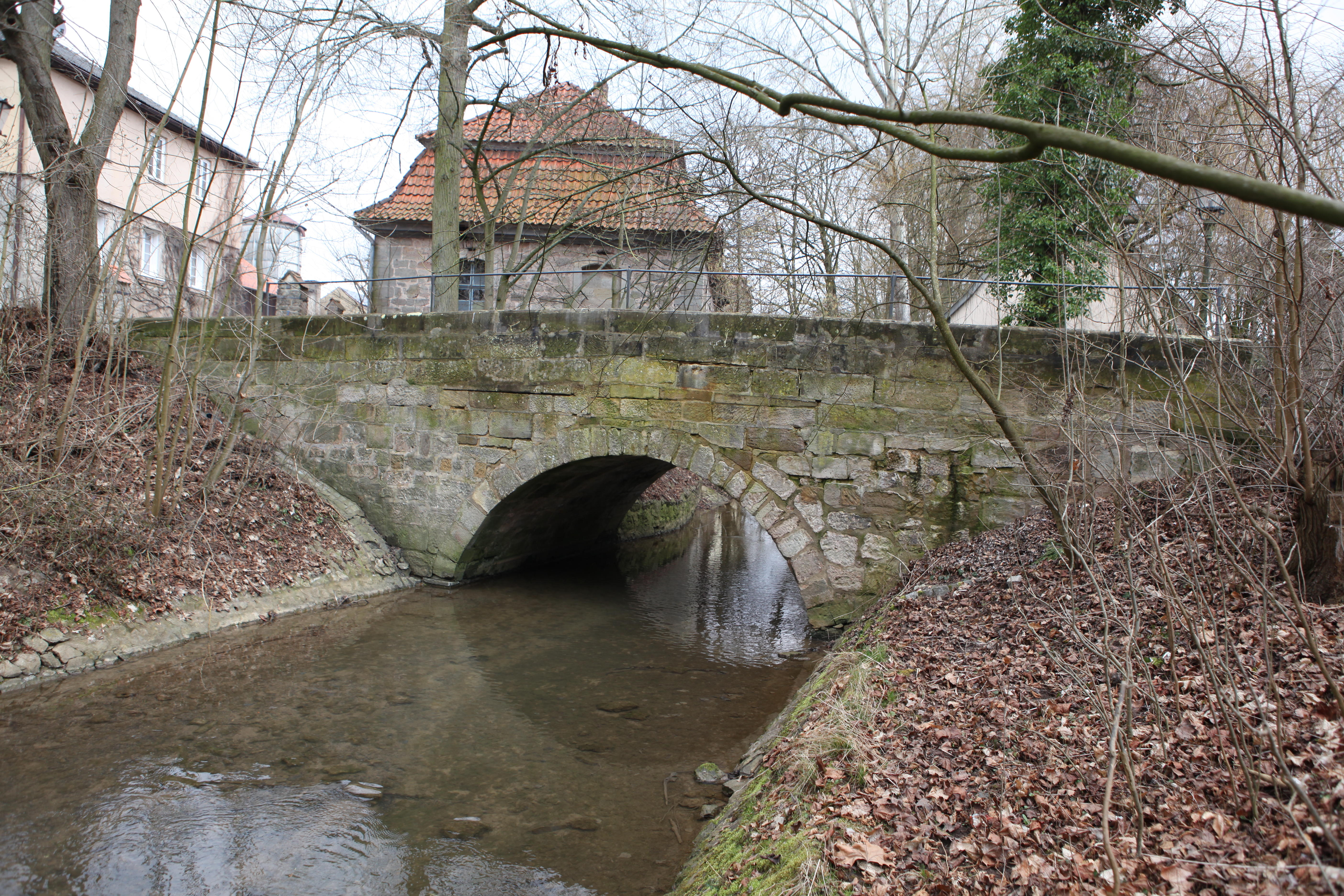
- Bridge over the Füllbach in Niederfüllbach

Location
- Country: Germany
- State: Bavaria

Physical characteristics
- Mouth
  - location: Itz
  - coordinates: 50.2194°N 10.9822°E
- Length: 10.5 km (6.5 mi)

Basin features
- Progression: Itz→ Main→ Rhine→ North Sea

Füllbach (German pronunciation: [ˈfʏlbax]) is a river of Bavaria, Germany. It flows into the Itz in Niederfüllbach.

== See also ==
- List of rivers of Bavaria
