= Ebersdorf bei Coburg =

Ebersdorf b.Coburg
- Municipality
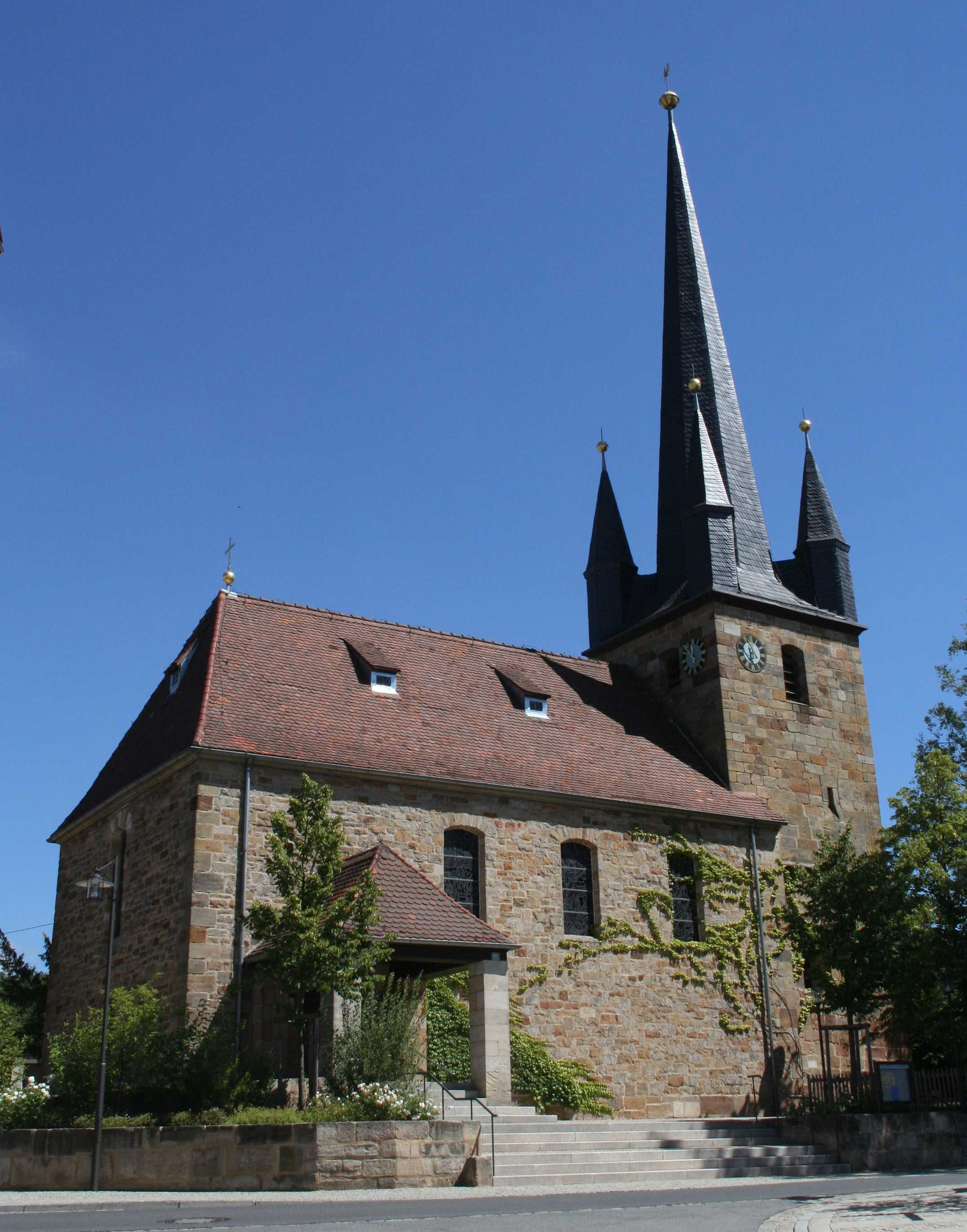
- Protestant church

- Coat of arms

- Location of Ebersdorf b.Coburg within Coburg district
- Interactive map of Ebersdorf b.Coburg
- Location within Germany Location within Bavaria
- Coordinates: 50°13′12″N 11°04′14″E
- Country: Germany
- State: Bavaria
- Admin. region: Oberfranken
- District: Coburg
- Subdivisions: 6 Ortsteile

Government
  - Mayor (2020–26): Bernd Reisenweber

Area
  - Total: 26.36 km^{2} (10.18 sq mi)
- Elevation: 310 m (1,020 ft)

Population (2025-12-31)
  - Total: 6,040
  - Density: 229/km^{2} (593/sq mi)
- Time zone: UTC+01:00 (CET)
  - Summer (DST): UTC+02:00 (CEST)
- Postal codes: 96237
- Dialling codes: 09562
- Vehicle registration: CO
- Website: www.ebersdorf.de

Ebersdorf bei Coburg (German pronunciation: [ˈeːbɐsdɔʁf baɪ ˈkoːbʊʁk], lit. 'Ebersdorf near Coburg') is a municipality in the district of Coburg in Bavaria in Germany.

== Geography ==
=== Location ===
Ebersdorf lies on the upper course of the river Füllbach, a tributary of the Itz, and at the northern edge of the Lichtenfels Forest (Lichtenfelser Forst).

=== Villages ===
The municipality of Ebersdorf bei Coburg consists of six villages. The eponymous village of Ebersdorf and Frohnlach in the south of the municipality have grown together. Großgarnstadt is the central village (and parish village) in the north. Other villages are Oberfüllbach, Kleingarnstadt and Friesendorf.

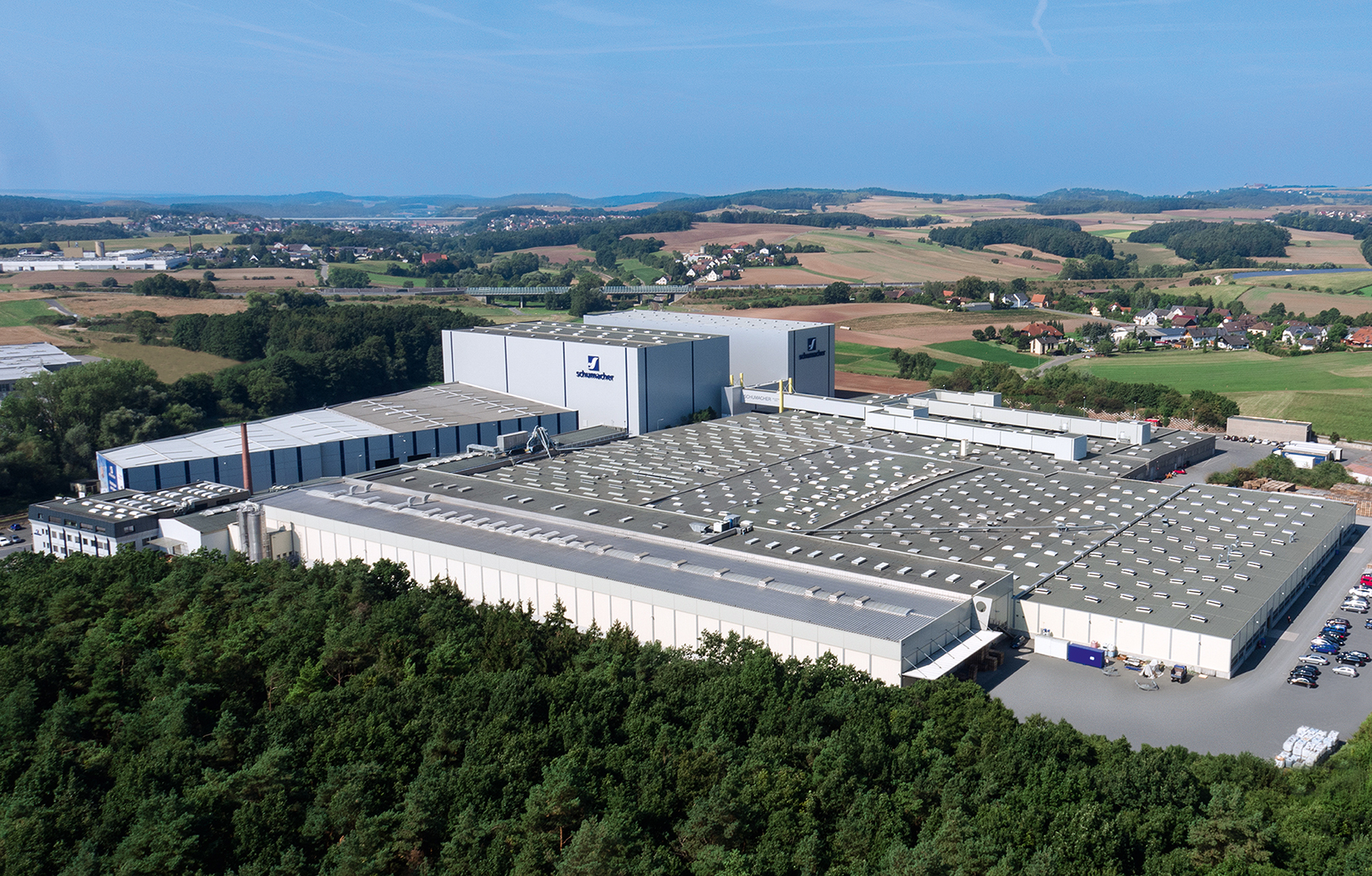
Schumacher Factory

The largest employer in Ebersdorf, with around 800 employees, is Schumacher Packaging, which manufactures corrugated cardboard.

== Transport ==
Ebersdorf can be reached by car via motorway A 73 Suhl-Coburg-Nuremberg. Ebersdorf has a station at Eisenach–Lichtenfels railway. The Steinach Valley Railway from Ebersdorf to Neustadt bei Coburg has first been disrupted by the Inner German Border and was later lifted in 2000.
