= Rimpar =

- Municipality
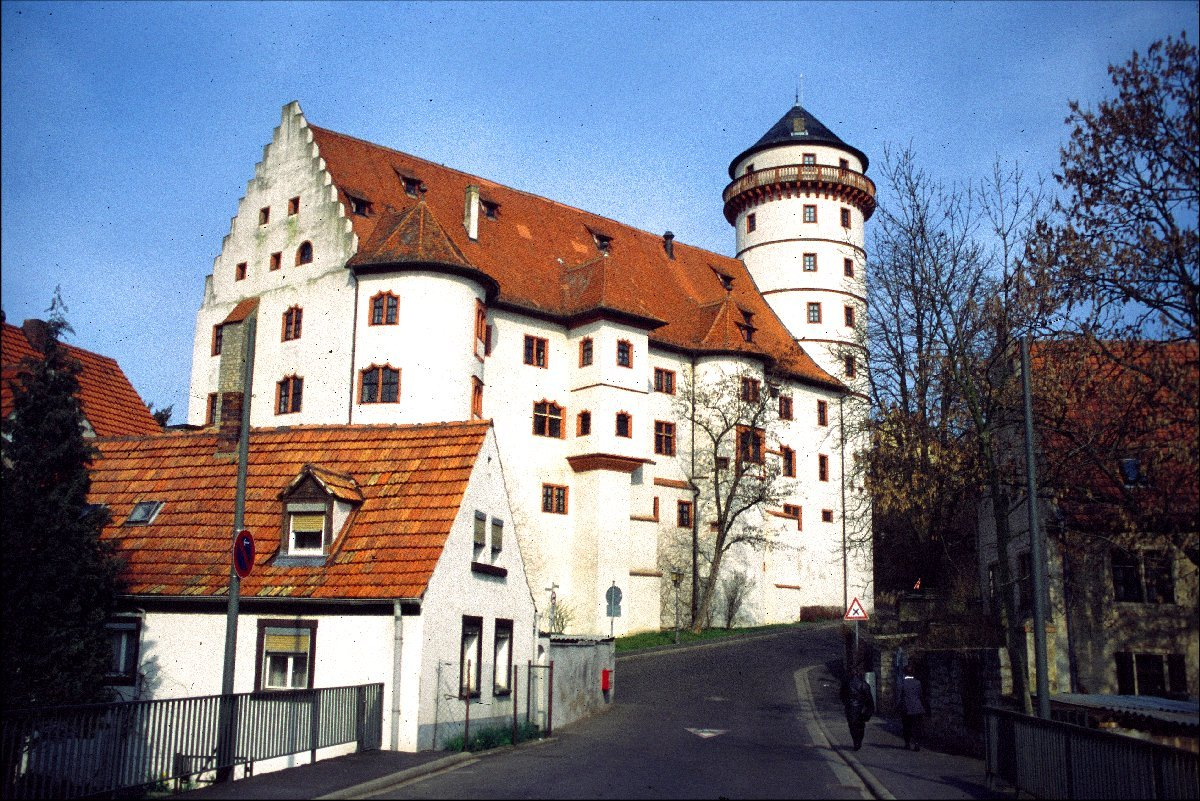
- Rimpar Castle

- Coat of arms

- Location of Rimpar within Würzburg district
- Interactive map of Rimpar
- Location within Germany Location within Bavaria
- Coordinates: 49°51′N 9°57′E
- Country: Germany
- State: Bavaria
- Admin. region: Unterfranken
- District: Würzburg

Government
  - Mayor (2020–26): Bernhard Weidner (CSU)

Area
  - Total: 36.42 km^{2} (14.06 sq mi)
- Elevation: 249 m (817 ft)

Population (2025-12-31)
  - Total: 7,569
  - Density: 207.8/km^{2} (538.3/sq mi)
- Time zone: UTC+01:00 (CET)
  - Summer (DST): UTC+02:00 (CEST)
- Postal codes: 97222
- Dialling codes: 09365
- Vehicle registration: WÜ
- Website: www.rimpar.de

Rimpar is a market town in the district of Würzburg in the German state of Bavaria. It is located about 10 km (6 mi) north of the City of Würzburg. The municipality includes the villages of Gramschatz and Maidbronn, incorporated in 1978.

== History ==
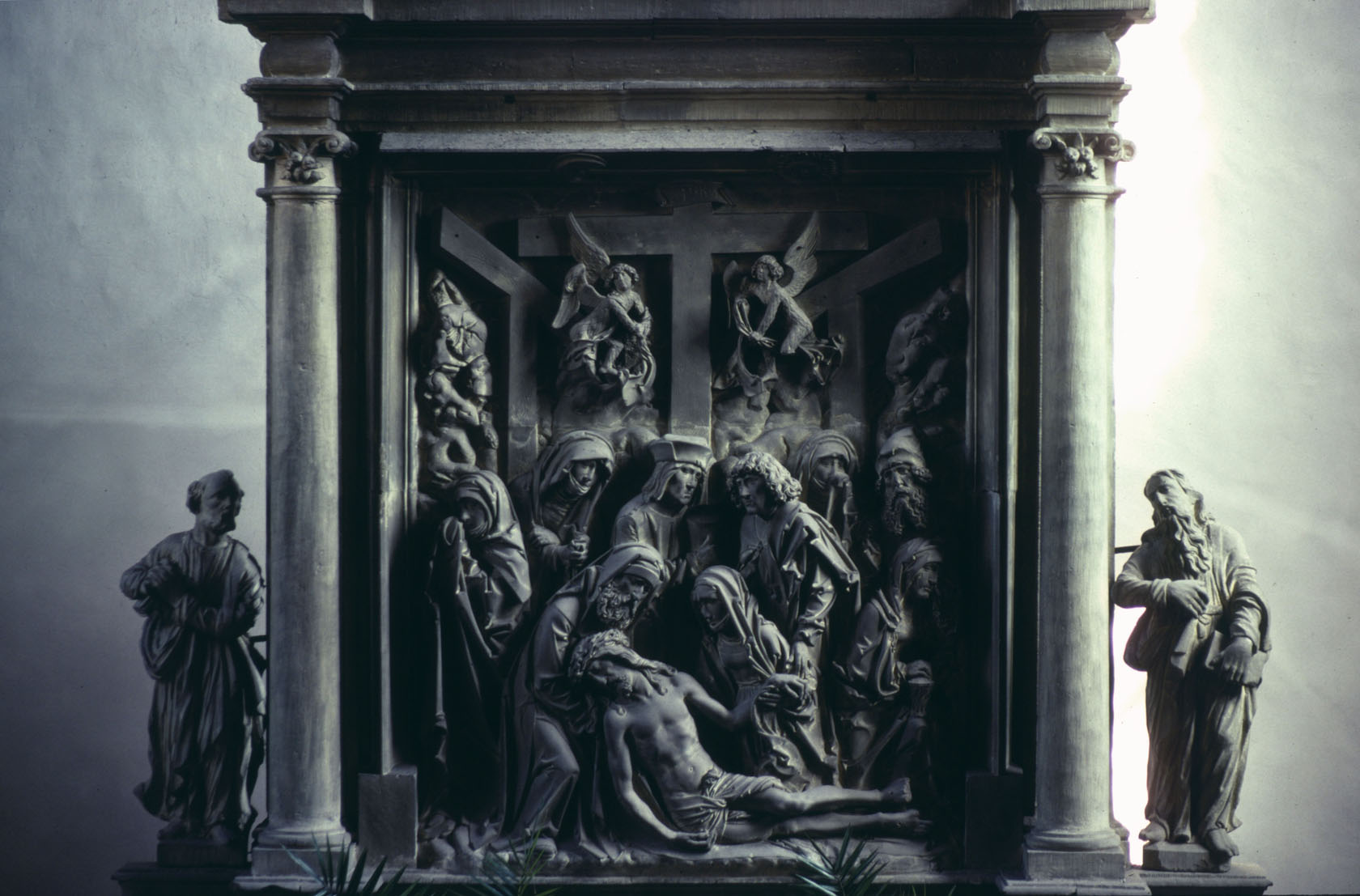
Lamentation of Christ, Maidbronn

Rimpar was first mentioned in an 1126 deed. Hermann I von Lobdeburg, Bishop of Würzburg, established a Cistercian nunnery, Maidbronn Abbey, at neighbouring Maidbronn in 1232. The former abbey church, dedicated to Saint Afra, contains a sandstone altarpiece of the Lamentation of Christ by Tilman Riemenschneider dated to 1525, considered the last of his major works.

The von Grumbach noble family had Rimpar Castle built in 1347. In 1593 Konrad von Grumbach sold Rimpar to Prince-Bishop Julius Echter of Würzburg. With the Grand Duchy of Würzburg Rimpar fell to the Kingdom of Bavaria in 1814.

== Notable people ==
- Wilhelm von Grumbach, knight and adventurer, was born in Rimpar on 1 June 1503. Placed under the imperial ban by Emperor Maximilian II he was executed at Gotha on 18 April 1567.
- Henry Lehman, born about 1821 in Rimpar emigrated to Montgomery, Alabama in the United States in 1844. In 1850, along with his brothers, Emanuel and Mayer, he co-founded investment bank, Lehman Brothers. Henry Lehman died in 1855.

== Transport ==
Rimpar can be reached via the Bundesautobahn 7 at the Gramschatzer Wald junction. Bus service is provided to Würzburg on workdays every 30 minutes.

== Twin town ==
- Languidic, France, since 1997
