= Maidbronn =

- Ortsteil of Rimpar
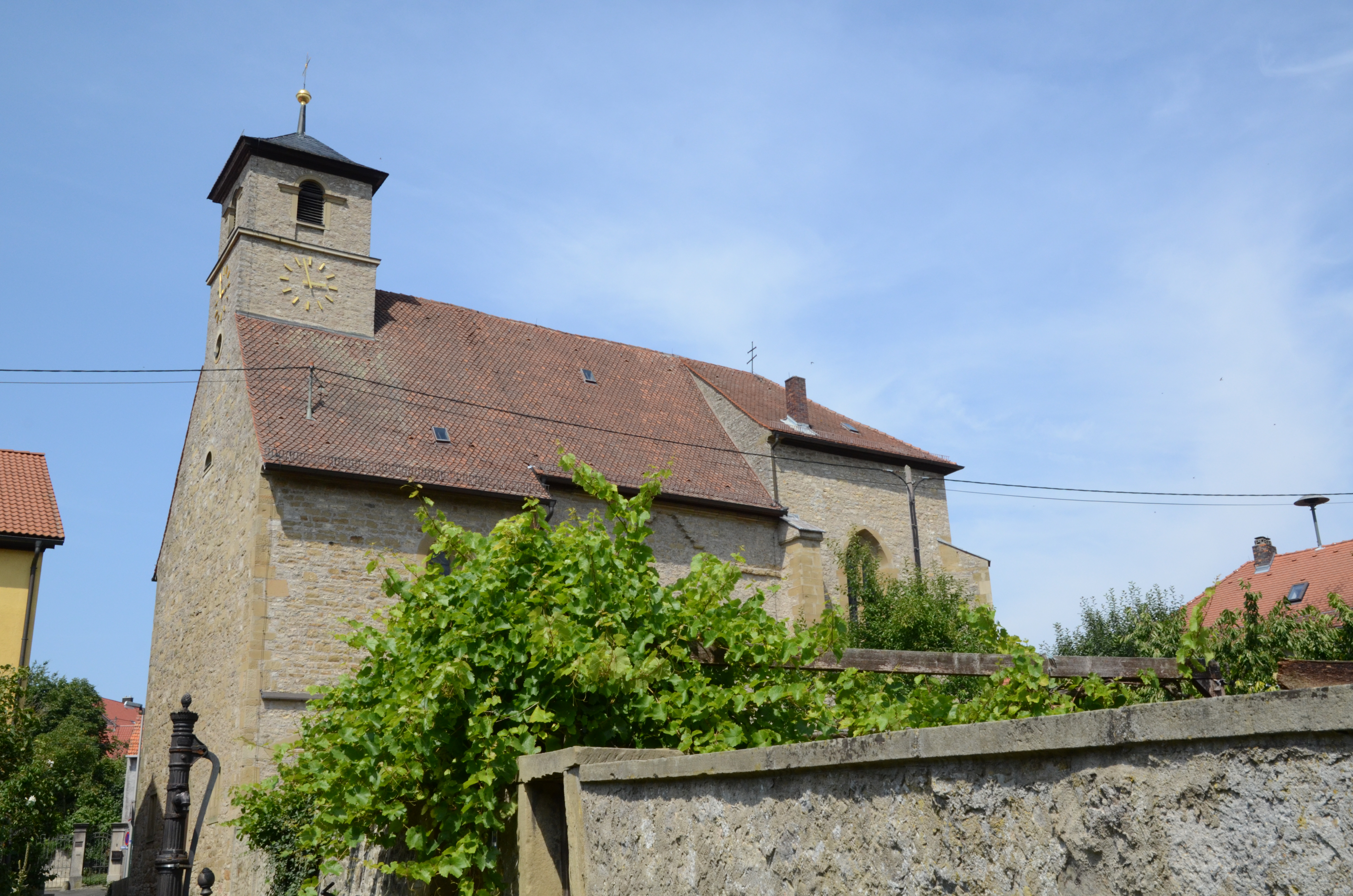
- Church of Saint Afra
- Interactive map of Maidbronn
- Location within Germany Location within Bavaria
- Coordinates: 49°50′49″N 09°58′16″E
- Country: Germany
- State: Bavaria
- Admin. region: Unterfranken
- District: Würzburg
- Municipality: Rimpar
- Elevation: 245 m (804 ft)

Population (2012-12-31)
  - Total: 1,032
- Time zone: UTC+01:00 (CET)
  - Summer (DST): UTC+02:00 (CEST)
- Postal codes: 97222
- Dialling codes: 09365
- Vehicle registration: WÜ

Maidbronn is a village in Bavaria, Germany, located about 7 kilometres (4.3 mi) northeast of Würzburg. It is part of the municipality Rimpar.

It was the location of the former Maidbronn Abbey, the church of which is still in use by the parish.
