= Henry II von Sonneberg =

Henry II of Sonneberg (before 1249 – 1288) was the descendant of the von Sonneberg family and the founder of the Sonnefeld Monastery.

The death of Duke Otto II of Merania on 19 June 1248 at Niesten Castle brought the end to the Imperial Duchy of Merania, in whose service the Herren (Lords) von Sonneberg had managed properties in the areas of Coburg and Sonneberg. Because of his service, Henry II was given the Herrschaft (territorial dominion) of Sonneberg and the authority to govern it. In 1252 and around 1260 he acquired from the Benedictine Abbey of Saalfeld the extensive possessions in the surrounding areas of Sonneberg and Coburg.

In 1260, Henry II, with his wife Kunigunde, founded the Sonnefeld Monastery and furnished it with the properties from their own possessions. In 1279, with other associates of the Sonnefeld Monastery, he was found among the witnesses of the foundation charter of the Himmelkron Monastery, where the first nuns were assumed to have come from Sonnefeld.

== Literature ==
- (de) Joachim Hotz: Zisterzienserklöster in Oberfranken (Cistercian Monasteries in Upper Franconia). In: Große Kunstführer, Band 98 (Great Art Leaders, Volume 98). Schnell and Steiner, Munich and Zurich 1982, ISBN 3-7954-0842-3, p. 64
- (de) Helmuth Meissner: Himmelkron: Geschichte und Geschichten, Namen und Daten (Himmelkron: History and Stories, Names and Dates). Gemeinde (Municipality of) Himmelkron, 1979, pp. 9 ff.

== Sources ==
- (de) Prof. G. Brückner: Landeskunde des Herzogthums Meinigen, Band 2: Die Topographie des Landes (Geography of the Duchy of Meinigen, Volume 2: The Topography of the Land), Verlag Brückner und Renner, Meinigen 1853, p. 442 ff.
