= Emanuel Lehman =

German-American banker (1827–1907)

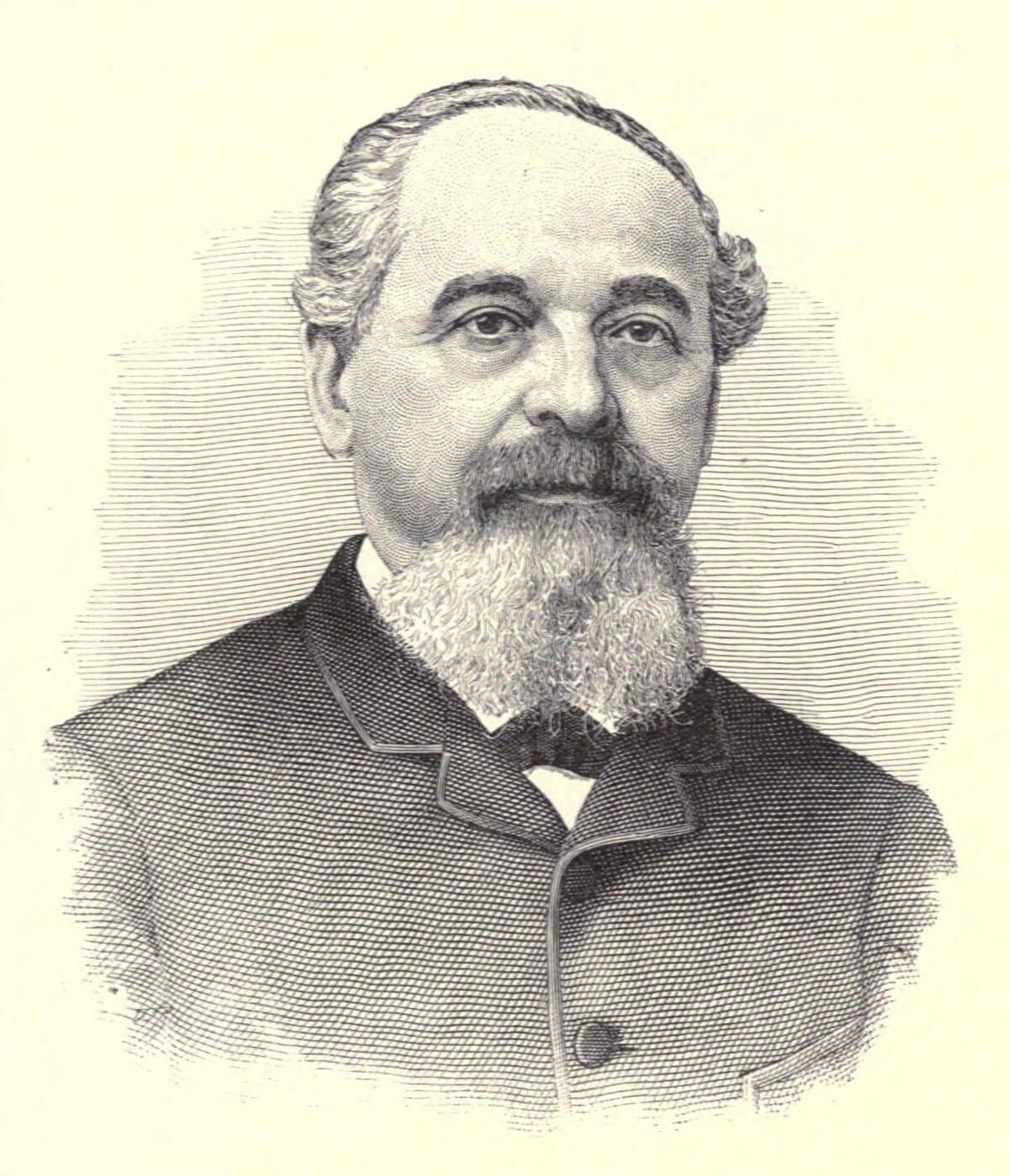
- Engraving of Lehman published 1895
- Born: Mendel Lehmann; February 15, 1827; Rimpar, Bavaria
- Died: January 10, 1907 (aged 79); New York City
- Occupation: Banker
- Known for: co-founder of Lehman Brothers
- Spouse: Pauline Sondheim (m. 1859; died 1871)
- Children: Milton Lehman; Philip Lehman; Harriet Lehman; Eveline Lehman
- Relatives: Lehman family
- Family: Henry Lehman (brother); Mayer Lehman (brother)

Emanuel Lehman (born Mendel Lehmann; February 15, 1827 – January 10, 1907) was an American banker. He was the younger brother of Henry Lehman and the older brother of Mayer Lehman, and he was a co-founder of Lehman Brothers.

== Biography ==
Emanuel Lehman was born in Rimpar, Bavaria on February 15, 1827, the son of Eva (Rosenheim) and Abraham Lehmann, a cattle merchant. He traveled to the United States in 1847 to join his brother Henry in business.

He married Pauline Sondheim in May 1859, and they had four children. His wife died in 1871. he died of natural causes on the afternoon of January 10, 1907 in New York City at 79.

When the newly formed Mutual Alliance Trust Company opened for business in New York on the Tuesday after June 29, 1902, there were 13 directors, including Lehman, William Rockefeller, and Cornelius Vanderbilt.

== Philanthropy and family ==
In 1897, he donated $100,000 (equivalent to $3.9 million in 2025) to the Hebrew Orphan Asylum of New York, under the condition "to enlarge and perpetuate its usefulness." In May 1859, he married Pauline Sondheim, daughter of Louis Sondheim of New York. Pauline died in 1871. They had four children: Milton Lehman; Philip Lehman, a partner in the firm; Harriet Philip Lehman, and Evelyn Philip Lehman. He was of Jewish background.

== See also ==
- Lehman family
