= Philip Lehman =

American investment banker

- Born: November 9, 1861; New York City
- Died: March 21, 1947 (aged 85); New York City
- Occupation: Investment banker
- Known for: Art collector
- Spouse: Carrie Lauer (m. 1884; died 1937)
- Children: Robert Lehman (1891–1969)
- Parent(s): Emanuel Lehman; Pauline Sondheim
- Relatives: Lehman family

Philip Lehman (November 9, 1861 – March 21, 1947) was an American investment banker.

== Biography ==
Philip Lehman was born in New York City to Emanuel Lehman (1827–1907) and Pauline Sondheim (1843–1871). Emanuel was a co-founder of the now-defunct investment bank, Lehman Brothers. Philip became a partner in the family-owned firm in 1887 and was the firm's managing partner from 1901 to 1925. He was also the first chairman of the board of the Lehman Corporation. Lehman was notable as one of the first financiers to recognize the potential of issuing stock as a way for new companies to raise capital.

Philip married Carrie Lauer (1865–1937) on January 3, 1884. They had two children, Pauline (born 1887) and Robert Lehman (1891–1969). The family resided in a 5-story limestone mansion designed in 1899 by John H. Duncan on 7 West 54th Street, now known as the "Philip Lehman Mansion" and designated as a New York landmark in 1981.

Lehman began collecting major artworks in 1911, the bulk of which he willed to his son Robert. His collection today forms part of the exhibition in the Robert Lehman Wing at the Metropolitan Museum of Art. He died of old age on the night of March 21, 1947.
