= Lichtenfels Forest =

Forest in Bavaria, Germany

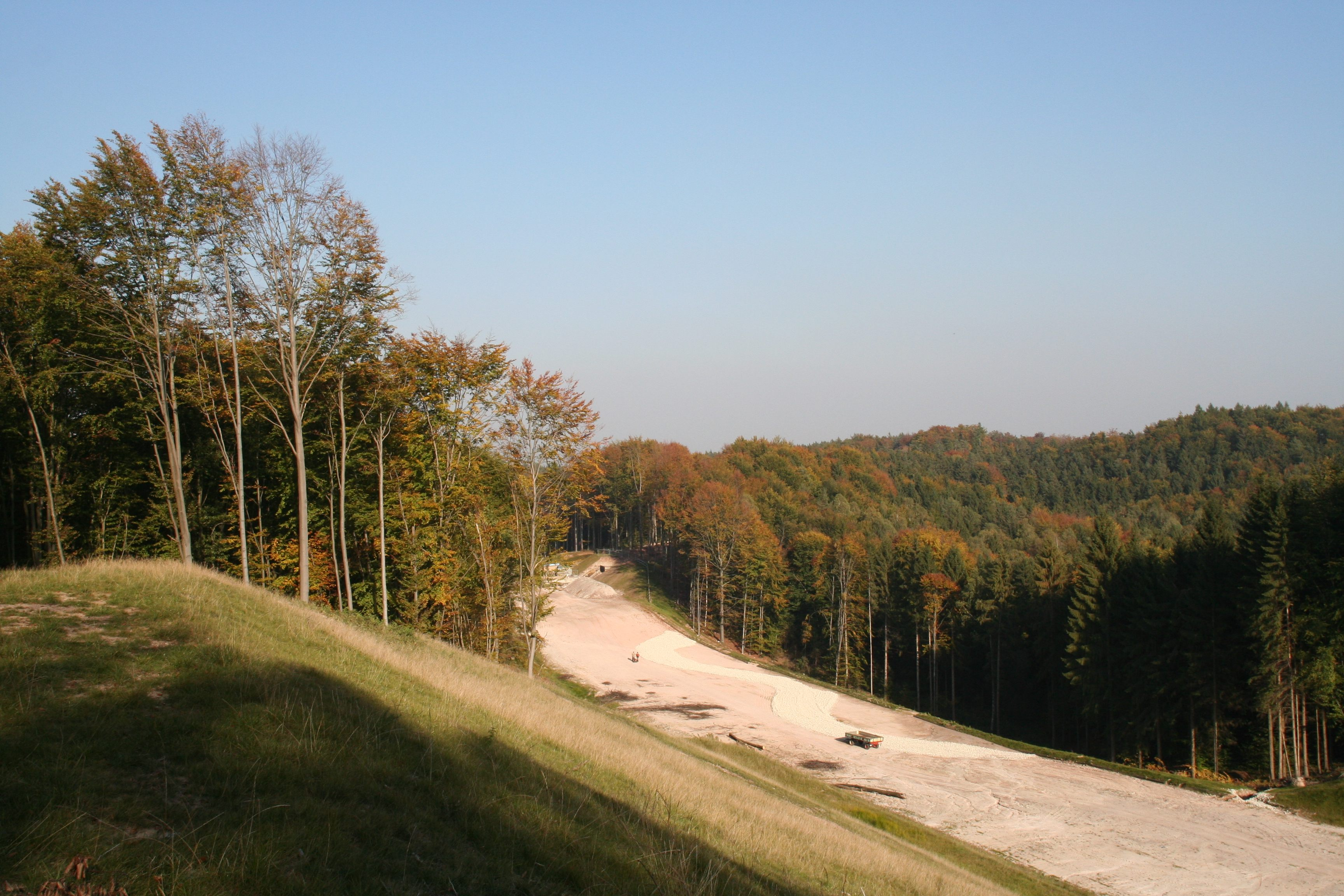
Bundesautobahn A73 under construction in the Lichtenfels Forest

The Lichtenfels Forest (German: Lichtenfelser Forst) is a forest northwest of the town of Lichtenfels in Upper Franconia in northern Bavaria, Germany.

The vegetation consists mostly of the coniferous trees, with small areas mixed with forests of oak and birch.

During the High Middle Ages the vast forest was the property of the Banz Abbey. The northern edge of the forest in the 13th Century was inhabited by the Lords of Sonneberg. The places Grub am Forst and its district Roth am Forst (which name is indicative of a settlement created by the clearing of the forest), Weißenbrunn am Forst and Buch am Forst all owe their names to their locations on the outskirts of the Lichtenfels Forest.

When the federal highway Bundesautobahn 73 was under construction, there were some protests by environmental conservation groups because the route was planned to cut through the Lichtenfels Forest; e.g. a lawsuit filed by Bund für Umwelt und Naturschutz Deutschland [German, “Confederation for the Protection of the Environment and Nature of Germany”] against the regional government of Upper Franconia was turned down by the Federal Administrative Court of Germany in 2004. The same protests were also made for the same reason against Deutsche Bahn’s high-speed track, the Nuremberg–Erfurt high-speed railway, which now runs across the Lichtenfels Forest between Niederfüllbach and Weißenbrunn am Forst.
