= Robert Schulz =

Robert Schulz may refer to:

- Robert Schulz (musician) (born 1938), American jazz musician
- Robert Schulz (astronomer) (born 1972), Austrian amateur astronomer
- Robert L. Schulz, American political activist
- Bob Schulz (fashion designer) (1923–2008), Australian fashion designer

== See also ==
- Asteroid 410475 Robertschulz, named after the astronomer
- Robert Schultz (disambiguation)
