= Robert Schultz =

Robert Schultz may refer to:

- Robert Schultz (figure skater) (born 1989), Canadian pair skater
- Robert Schultz (footballer) (1944–2023), Australian rules footballer
- Robert Weir Schultz (1860–1951), Scottish Arts and Crafts architect, artist, landscape designer and furniture designer
- Bob Schultz (1923–1979), American baseball player

== See also ==
- Robert Schulz (disambiguation)
