= Bob Schulz (fashion designer) =

Australian fashion designer

Robert Schulz (16 April 1923 – 17 May 2008) was an Australian fashion designer.

He was born in Booleroo, South Australia on 16 April 1923.

Schulz established and ran Young Jaeger from 1959 to 1965, before working for the Milan store La Rinascente and living in Italy for some years. In 1966, Helmut Newton photographed his work for the magazine Queen.

He returned to London to restart his couture business in a large house in Wilton Place, Knightsbridge, but the business failed after a bust water pipe and insurers who refused to pay. He continued to design dresses until his retirement in 2006.

For his last three decades, he lived with Elio Marchesi, and from the late 1990s onwards in a small council flat off London's Fulham Road.
