= List of minor planets: 410001–411000 =

The following is a partial list of minor planets, running from minor-planet number 410001 through 411000, inclusive. The primary data for this and other partial lists is based on JPL's "Small-Body Orbital Elements" and data available from the Minor Planet Center. Critical list information is also provided by the MPC, unless otherwise specified from Lowell Observatory. A detailed description of the table's columns and additional sources are given on the main page including a complete list of every page in this series, and a statistical break-up on the dynamical classification of minor planets.

Also see the summary list of all named bodies in numerical and alphabetical order, and the corresponding naming citations for the number range of this particular list. New namings may only be added to this list after official publication, as the preannouncement of names is condemned by the Working Group for Small Bodies Nomenclature of the International Astronomical Union.

Near-Earth obj.	MBA (inner)	MBA (outer)	Centaur
Mars-crosser	MBA (middle)	Jupiter trojan	Trans-Neptunian obj.
Unclassified

== 410001–410100 ==
Designation			Discovery			Properties		Ref
Permanent	Provisional	Named after	Date	Site	Discoverer(s)	Category	Diam.	Ref
410001	2006 WV_{27}	—	November 22, 2006	7300	W. K. Y. Yeung	·	1.3 km	MPC · JPL
410002	2006 WW_{29}	—	November 24, 2006	Catalina	CSS	·	2.0 km	MPC · JPL
410003	2006 WY_{32}	—	October 23, 2006	Catalina	CSS	·	1.6 km	MPC · JPL
410004	2006 WO_{37}	—	November 16, 2006	Kitt Peak	Spacewatch	·	1.1 km	MPC · JPL
410005	2006 WW_{37}	—	November 16, 2006	Kitt Peak	Spacewatch	·	1.5 km	MPC · JPL
410006	2006 WE_{43}	—	September 27, 2006	Mount Lemmon	Mount Lemmon Survey	·	1.3 km	MPC · JPL
410007	2006 WZ_{44}	—	September 27, 2006	Mount Lemmon	Mount Lemmon Survey	·	1.7 km	MPC · JPL
410008	2006 WG_{73}	—	October 31, 2006	Mount Lemmon	Mount Lemmon Survey	·	1.1 km	MPC · JPL
410009	2006 WP_{73}	—	November 18, 2006	Kitt Peak	Spacewatch	(5)	1.3 km	MPC · JPL
410010	2006 WV_{76}	—	November 18, 2006	Kitt Peak	Spacewatch	·	1.2 km	MPC · JPL
410011	2006 WL_{77}	—	September 28, 2006	Mount Lemmon	Mount Lemmon Survey	(5)	1.1 km	MPC · JPL
410012	2006 WX_{77}	—	October 19, 2006	Mount Lemmon	Mount Lemmon Survey	·	1.9 km	MPC · JPL
410013	2006 WM_{83}	—	November 18, 2006	Kitt Peak	Spacewatch	·	1.2 km	MPC · JPL
410014	2006 WN_{101}	—	October 4, 2006	Mount Lemmon	Mount Lemmon Survey	(5)	990 m	MPC · JPL
410015	2006 WU_{127}	—	November 18, 2006	Marly	Observatoire Naef	·	2.1 km	MPC · JPL
410016	2006 WP_{149}	—	November 20, 2006	Kitt Peak	Spacewatch	·	1.0 km	MPC · JPL
410017	2006 WO_{158}	—	November 22, 2006	Socorro	LINEAR	·	1.2 km	MPC · JPL
410018	2006 WF_{160}	—	November 22, 2006	Mount Lemmon	Mount Lemmon Survey	GEF	1.3 km	MPC · JPL
410019	2006 WU_{173}	—	November 11, 2006	Kitt Peak	Spacewatch	·	1.3 km	MPC · JPL
410020	2006 WT_{175}	—	November 23, 2006	Kitt Peak	Spacewatch	·	1.5 km	MPC · JPL
410021	2006 WO_{178}	—	November 24, 2006	7300	W. K. Y. Yeung	·	1.5 km	MPC · JPL
410022	2006 WU_{189}	—	November 25, 2006	Mount Lemmon	Mount Lemmon Survey	JUN	870 m	MPC · JPL
410023	2006 WN_{200}	—	November 19, 2006	Kitt Peak	Spacewatch	·	1.1 km	MPC · JPL
410024	2006 WZ_{203}	—	November 27, 2006	Mount Lemmon	Mount Lemmon Survey	·	1.7 km	MPC · JPL
410025	2006 XO_{3}	—	December 12, 2006	Eskridge	Farpoint	·	1.2 km	MPC · JPL
410026	2006 XX_{9}	—	December 9, 2006	Kitt Peak	Spacewatch	·	1.3 km	MPC · JPL
410027	2006 XX_{19}	—	November 16, 2006	Mount Lemmon	Mount Lemmon Survey	·	1.6 km	MPC · JPL
410028	2006 XX_{20}	—	September 27, 2006	Mount Lemmon	Mount Lemmon Survey	ADE	2.7 km	MPC · JPL
410029	2006 XB_{30}	—	November 14, 2006	Mount Lemmon	Mount Lemmon Survey	·	2.0 km	MPC · JPL
410030	2006 XX_{30}	—	November 11, 2006	Kitt Peak	Spacewatch	·	1.2 km	MPC · JPL
410031	2006 XL_{31}	—	December 10, 2006	Kitt Peak	Spacewatch	·	1.0 km	MPC · JPL
410032	2006 XV_{53}	—	November 22, 2006	Socorro	LINEAR	·	1.0 km	MPC · JPL
410033	2006 XK_{55}	—	December 15, 2006	Mount Lemmon	Mount Lemmon Survey	EUN	1.3 km	MPC · JPL
410034	2006 XC_{67}	—	November 22, 2006	Mount Lemmon	Mount Lemmon Survey	·	1.9 km	MPC · JPL
410035	2006 XO_{68}	—	December 14, 2006	San Marcello	San Marcello	ADE	1.9 km	MPC · JPL
410036	2006 YF_{6}	—	December 17, 2006	Mount Lemmon	Mount Lemmon Survey	·	2.2 km	MPC · JPL
410037	2006 YY_{8}	—	December 20, 2006	Mount Lemmon	Mount Lemmon Survey	·	700 m	MPC · JPL
410038	2006 YX_{15}	—	December 20, 2006	Mount Lemmon	Mount Lemmon Survey	·	3.1 km	MPC · JPL
410039	2006 YO_{17}	—	October 31, 2006	Mount Lemmon	Mount Lemmon Survey	·	1.5 km	MPC · JPL
410040	2006 YX_{24}	—	December 9, 2006	Kitt Peak	Spacewatch	·	1.3 km	MPC · JPL
410041	2006 YB_{34}	—	December 21, 2006	Kitt Peak	Spacewatch	·	1.3 km	MPC · JPL
410042	2006 YN_{36}	—	December 13, 2006	Kitt Peak	Spacewatch	·	1.2 km	MPC · JPL
410043	2006 YQ_{43}	—	December 25, 2006	Kitt Peak	Spacewatch	WIT	1.3 km	MPC · JPL
410044	2006 YS_{53}	—	December 27, 2006	Mount Lemmon	Mount Lemmon Survey	·	2.3 km	MPC · JPL
410045	2007 AV_{3}	—	January 8, 2007	Catalina	CSS	·	1.3 km	MPC · JPL
410046	2007 AP_{8}	—	November 18, 2006	Mount Lemmon	Mount Lemmon Survey	AEO	1.2 km	MPC · JPL
410047	2007 AU_{9}	—	November 25, 2006	Mount Lemmon	Mount Lemmon Survey	·	1.2 km	MPC · JPL
410048	2007 AD_{11}	—	January 10, 2007	Socorro	LINEAR	·	2.4 km	MPC · JPL
410049	2007 AL_{12}	—	January 14, 2007	Bergisch Gladbach	W. Bickel	EUN	1.6 km	MPC · JPL
410050	2007 AX_{17}	—	January 14, 2007	Mount Nyukasa	Japan Aerospace Exploration Agency	(5)	1.3 km	MPC · JPL
410051	2007 AA_{25}	—	December 13, 2006	Mount Lemmon	Mount Lemmon Survey	JUN	1.1 km	MPC · JPL
410052	2007 AO_{25}	—	January 15, 2007	Anderson Mesa	LONEOS	(5)	1.5 km	MPC · JPL
410053	2007 AJ_{27}	—	January 10, 2007	Mount Lemmon	Mount Lemmon Survey	·	1.6 km	MPC · JPL
410054	2007 AP_{29}	—	January 10, 2007	Mount Lemmon	Mount Lemmon Survey	·	1.5 km	MPC · JPL
410055	2007 BT_{15}	—	January 17, 2007	Kitt Peak	Spacewatch	·	1.5 km	MPC · JPL
410056	2007 BW_{19}	—	January 23, 2007	Socorro	LINEAR	·	2.1 km	MPC · JPL
410057	2007 BQ_{21}	—	January 24, 2007	Socorro	LINEAR	·	2.8 km	MPC · JPL
410058	2007 BK_{30}	—	December 24, 2006	Catalina	CSS	·	1.7 km	MPC · JPL
410059	2007 BN_{48}	—	January 26, 2007	Kitt Peak	Spacewatch	·	1.9 km	MPC · JPL
410060	2007 BE_{54}	—	January 24, 2007	Kitt Peak	Spacewatch	·	1.8 km	MPC · JPL
410061	2007 BS_{59}	—	January 25, 2007	Catalina	CSS	·	2.6 km	MPC · JPL
410062	2007 BH_{65}	—	January 27, 2007	Mount Lemmon	Mount Lemmon Survey	·	1.6 km	MPC · JPL
410063	2007 BU_{69}	—	January 27, 2007	Mount Lemmon	Mount Lemmon Survey	·	2.1 km	MPC · JPL
410064	2007 BD_{73}	—	January 28, 2007	Mayhill	Lowe, A.	·	1.8 km	MPC · JPL
410065	2007 BK_{77}	—	January 17, 2007	Kitt Peak	Spacewatch	HOF	3.0 km	MPC · JPL
410066	2007 CT_{2}	—	February 6, 2007	Kitt Peak	Spacewatch	NEM	2.2 km	MPC · JPL
410067	2007 CV_{4}	—	February 6, 2007	Mount Lemmon	Mount Lemmon Survey	WIT	1.1 km	MPC · JPL
410068	2007 CJ_{6}	—	February 6, 2007	Kitt Peak	Spacewatch	·	2.0 km	MPC · JPL
410069	2007 CP_{6}	—	November 27, 2006	Mount Lemmon	Mount Lemmon Survey	·	1.2 km	MPC · JPL
410070	2007 CL_{43}	—	January 27, 2007	Kitt Peak	Spacewatch	·	1.2 km	MPC · JPL
410071	2007 CY_{48}	—	February 10, 2007	Mount Lemmon	Mount Lemmon Survey	·	1.4 km	MPC · JPL
410072	2007 CA_{53}	—	February 13, 2007	Socorro	LINEAR	GEF	1.6 km	MPC · JPL
410073	2007 CH_{55}	—	February 10, 2007	Mount Lemmon	Mount Lemmon Survey	·	1.4 km	MPC · JPL
410074	2007 CM_{58}	—	February 10, 2007	Palomar	NEAT	·	1.6 km	MPC · JPL
410075	2007 CB_{60}	—	February 10, 2007	Catalina	CSS	·	2.3 km	MPC · JPL
410076	2007 DH_{2}	—	February 16, 2007	Catalina	CSS	·	1.7 km	MPC · JPL
410077	2007 DK_{3}	—	February 16, 2007	Catalina	CSS	·	1.6 km	MPC · JPL
410078	2007 DJ_{15}	—	November 27, 2006	Mount Lemmon	Mount Lemmon Survey	·	1.4 km	MPC · JPL
410079	2007 DP_{59}	—	December 24, 2006	Kitt Peak	Spacewatch	·	1.5 km	MPC · JPL
410080	2007 DQ_{65}	—	February 21, 2007	Kitt Peak	Spacewatch	KOR	1.2 km	MPC · JPL
410081	2007 DM_{90}	—	February 23, 2007	Kitt Peak	Spacewatch	·	1.8 km	MPC · JPL
410082	2007 DW_{97}	—	February 23, 2007	Kitt Peak	Spacewatch	DOR	2.3 km	MPC · JPL
410083	2007 DJ_{100}	—	February 25, 2007	Kitt Peak	Spacewatch	HOF	2.8 km	MPC · JPL
410084	2007 DJ_{102}	—	January 27, 2007	Mount Lemmon	Mount Lemmon Survey	·	1.6 km	MPC · JPL
410085	2007 DP_{107}	—	February 22, 2007	Mount Graham	Mount Graham	·	1.4 km	MPC · JPL
410086	2007 DD_{112}	—	February 26, 2007	Mount Lemmon	Mount Lemmon Survey	·	2.5 km	MPC · JPL
410087	2007 DN_{113}	—	February 21, 2007	Mount Lemmon	Mount Lemmon Survey	·	2.0 km	MPC · JPL
410088	2007 EJ	—	March 9, 2007	Mount Lemmon	Mount Lemmon Survey	APO +1km	1.0 km	MPC · JPL
410089	2007 EG_{13}	—	March 9, 2007	Mount Lemmon	Mount Lemmon Survey	WIT	1.1 km	MPC · JPL
410090	2007 EV_{21}	—	February 23, 2007	Mount Lemmon	Mount Lemmon Survey	·	2.0 km	MPC · JPL
410091	2007 EZ_{42}	—	February 25, 2007	Mount Lemmon	Mount Lemmon Survey	KOR	1.6 km	MPC · JPL
410092	2007 EG_{52}	—	March 11, 2007	Catalina	CSS	·	1.8 km	MPC · JPL
410093	2007 EH_{57}	—	February 27, 2007	Kitt Peak	Spacewatch	·	2.3 km	MPC · JPL
410094	2007 EQ_{57}	—	March 9, 2007	Kitt Peak	Spacewatch	·	2.9 km	MPC · JPL
410095	2007 EX_{65}	—	March 10, 2007	Kitt Peak	Spacewatch	·	3.1 km	MPC · JPL
410096	2007 ET_{81}	—	March 11, 2007	Kitt Peak	Spacewatch	·	3.5 km	MPC · JPL
410097	2007 EC_{86}	—	March 12, 2007	Mount Lemmon	Mount Lemmon Survey	TIR	3.4 km	MPC · JPL
410098	2007 EM_{105}	—	March 11, 2007	Mount Lemmon	Mount Lemmon Survey	·	1.8 km	MPC · JPL
410099	2007 ET_{105}	—	February 26, 2007	Mount Lemmon	Mount Lemmon Survey	·	2.3 km	MPC · JPL
410100	2007 EB_{120}	—	March 13, 2007	Mount Lemmon	Mount Lemmon Survey	LIX	3.9 km	MPC · JPL

== 410101–410200 ==
back to top

Designation			Discovery			Properties		Ref
Permanent	Provisional	Named after	Date	Site	Discoverer(s)	Category	Diam.	Ref
410101	2007 EF_{120}	—	March 13, 2007	Mount Lemmon	Mount Lemmon Survey	EOS	2.1 km	MPC · JPL
410102	2007 EG_{127}	—	March 9, 2007	Palomar	NEAT	·	1.1 km	MPC · JPL
410103	2007 EC_{130}	—	March 9, 2007	Mount Lemmon	Mount Lemmon Survey	·	2.1 km	MPC · JPL
410104	2007 EJ_{130}	—	December 20, 2006	Mount Lemmon	Mount Lemmon Survey	·	2.0 km	MPC · JPL
410105	2007 ES_{138}	—	March 12, 2007	Kitt Peak	Spacewatch	·	2.3 km	MPC · JPL
410106	2007 EM_{148}	—	September 23, 2005	Kitt Peak	Spacewatch	·	1.8 km	MPC · JPL
410107	2007 EW_{172}	—	March 14, 2007	Kitt Peak	Spacewatch	EOS	1.9 km	MPC · JPL
410108	2007 EG_{189}	—	March 13, 2007	Mount Lemmon	Mount Lemmon Survey	·	2.0 km	MPC · JPL
410109	2007 EX_{191}	—	March 13, 2007	Kitt Peak	Spacewatch	·	2.7 km	MPC · JPL
410110	2007 EV_{194}	—	March 15, 2007	Kitt Peak	Spacewatch	·	1.6 km	MPC · JPL
410111	2007 EZ_{196}	—	October 7, 2004	Kitt Peak	Spacewatch	KOR	1.6 km	MPC · JPL
410112	2007 EJ_{200}	—	March 12, 2007	Catalina	CSS	·	2.7 km	MPC · JPL
410113	2007 ET_{217}	—	March 13, 2007	Kitt Peak	Spacewatch	·	2.5 km	MPC · JPL
410114	2007 EC_{218}	—	March 9, 2007	Mount Lemmon	Mount Lemmon Survey	·	1.5 km	MPC · JPL
410115	2007 EW_{218}	—	March 11, 2007	Mount Lemmon	Mount Lemmon Survey	LUT	5.1 km	MPC · JPL
410116	2007 EG_{220}	—	March 13, 2007	Mount Lemmon	Mount Lemmon Survey	·	3.8 km	MPC · JPL
410117	2007 FU	—	March 16, 2007	Kitt Peak	Spacewatch	·	2.9 km	MPC · JPL
410118	2007 FU_{9}	—	March 16, 2007	Kitt Peak	Spacewatch	·	1.3 km	MPC · JPL
410119	2007 FJ_{25}	—	February 26, 2007	Mount Lemmon	Mount Lemmon Survey	·	2.1 km	MPC · JPL
410120	2007 FF_{31}	—	March 13, 2007	Kitt Peak	Spacewatch	EOS	1.8 km	MPC · JPL
410121	2007 FO_{33}	—	February 27, 2007	Kitt Peak	Spacewatch	·	1.6 km	MPC · JPL
410122	2007 FO_{36}	—	March 26, 2007	Mount Lemmon	Mount Lemmon Survey	·	1.9 km	MPC · JPL
410123	2007 FW_{48}	—	March 26, 2007	Kitt Peak	Spacewatch	EOS	2.1 km	MPC · JPL
410124	2007 FY_{48}	—	March 26, 2007	Mount Lemmon	Mount Lemmon Survey	THM	2.1 km	MPC · JPL
410125	2007 FK_{50}	—	March 25, 2007	Mount Lemmon	Mount Lemmon Survey	EOS	2.0 km	MPC · JPL
410126	2007 GU_{7}	—	March 13, 2007	Kitt Peak	Spacewatch	EOS	1.7 km	MPC · JPL
410127	2007 GL_{9}	—	March 26, 2007	Kitt Peak	Spacewatch	·	3.5 km	MPC · JPL
410128	2007 GG_{11}	—	March 13, 2007	Kitt Peak	Spacewatch	·	1.3 km	MPC · JPL
410129	2007 GM_{16}	—	April 11, 2007	Kitt Peak	Spacewatch	·	1.9 km	MPC · JPL
410130	2007 GK_{18}	—	April 11, 2007	Catalina	CSS	·	4.2 km	MPC · JPL
410131	2007 GS_{52}	—	April 14, 2007	Kitt Peak	Spacewatch	T_{j} (2.96)	3.3 km	MPC · JPL
410132	2007 GC_{53}	—	April 14, 2007	Mount Lemmon	Mount Lemmon Survey	·	2.9 km	MPC · JPL
410133	2007 GU_{58}	—	April 15, 2007	Mount Lemmon	Mount Lemmon Survey	·	1.7 km	MPC · JPL
410134	2007 GH_{65}	—	April 15, 2007	Kitt Peak	Spacewatch	·	3.2 km	MPC · JPL
410135	2007 GU_{67}	—	April 15, 2007	Kitt Peak	Spacewatch	·	570 m	MPC · JPL
410136	2007 HU_{4}	—	April 17, 2007	Črni Vrh	Mikuž, H.	EOS	2.1 km	MPC · JPL
410137	2007 HM_{18}	—	April 16, 2007	Mount Lemmon	Mount Lemmon Survey	·	2.5 km	MPC · JPL
410138	2007 HZ_{21}	—	April 18, 2007	Kitt Peak	Spacewatch	·	2.3 km	MPC · JPL
410139	2007 HQ_{24}	—	September 16, 2003	Kitt Peak	Spacewatch	·	3.0 km	MPC · JPL
410140	2007 HK_{26}	—	April 18, 2007	Kitt Peak	Spacewatch	·	4.4 km	MPC · JPL
410141	2007 HU_{26}	—	April 18, 2007	Mount Lemmon	Mount Lemmon Survey	·	2.6 km	MPC · JPL
410142	2007 HD_{28}	—	April 18, 2007	Kitt Peak	Spacewatch	·	3.1 km	MPC · JPL
410143	2007 HC_{29}	—	April 19, 2007	Mount Lemmon	Mount Lemmon Survey	·	2.7 km	MPC · JPL
410144	2007 HN_{34}	—	April 19, 2007	Kitt Peak	Spacewatch	EOS	1.8 km	MPC · JPL
410145	2007 HV_{34}	—	April 11, 2007	Kitt Peak	Spacewatch	·	2.6 km	MPC · JPL
410146	2007 HX_{35}	—	April 15, 2007	Kitt Peak	Spacewatch	·	3.7 km	MPC · JPL
410147	2007 HV_{41}	—	February 23, 2007	Catalina	CSS	H	640 m	MPC · JPL
410148	2007 HV_{43}	—	April 22, 2007	Mount Lemmon	Mount Lemmon Survey	TEL	1.6 km	MPC · JPL
410149	2007 HA_{46}	—	April 19, 2007	Mount Lemmon	Mount Lemmon Survey	·	3.0 km	MPC · JPL
410150	2007 HE_{49}	—	April 20, 2007	Kitt Peak	Spacewatch	·	3.0 km	MPC · JPL
410151	2007 HV_{52}	—	April 20, 2007	Kitt Peak	Spacewatch	·	4.9 km	MPC · JPL
410152	2007 HL_{54}	—	April 22, 2007	Kitt Peak	Spacewatch	EOS	2.6 km	MPC · JPL
410153	2007 HR_{58}	—	April 23, 2007	Mount Lemmon	Mount Lemmon Survey	·	3.6 km	MPC · JPL
410154	2007 HK_{65}	—	April 22, 2007	Catalina	CSS	·	700 m	MPC · JPL
410155	2007 HC_{69}	—	April 24, 2007	Kitt Peak	Spacewatch	·	3.0 km	MPC · JPL
410156	2007 HO_{97}	—	April 19, 2007	Mount Lemmon	Mount Lemmon Survey	·	4.5 km	MPC · JPL
410157	2007 JO_{5}	—	May 9, 2007	Mount Lemmon	Mount Lemmon Survey	EOS	1.8 km	MPC · JPL
410158	2007 JE_{20}	—	May 11, 2007	Mount Lemmon	Mount Lemmon Survey	THM	2.2 km	MPC · JPL
410159	2007 JA_{45}	—	May 11, 2007	Mount Lemmon	Mount Lemmon Survey	·	3.3 km	MPC · JPL
410160	2007 KL_{1}	—	May 17, 2007	Kitt Peak	Spacewatch	·	2.9 km	MPC · JPL
410161	2007 KS_{4}	—	May 24, 2007	Kitt Peak	Spacewatch	·	530 m	MPC · JPL
410162	2007 LU_{2}	—	June 8, 2007	Kitt Peak	Spacewatch	·	2.9 km	MPC · JPL
410163	2007 LK_{9}	—	May 11, 2007	Mount Lemmon	Mount Lemmon Survey	·	2.8 km	MPC · JPL
410164	2007 LT_{14}	—	June 10, 2007	Kitt Peak	Spacewatch	·	2.8 km	MPC · JPL
410165	2007 LW_{24}	—	June 14, 2007	Kitt Peak	Spacewatch	HYG	2.9 km	MPC · JPL
410166	2007 LU_{35}	—	May 11, 2007	Kitt Peak	Spacewatch	·	3.3 km	MPC · JPL
410167	2007 ML_{7}	—	June 18, 2007	Kitt Peak	Spacewatch	·	680 m	MPC · JPL
410168	2007 OW_{10}	—	July 20, 2007	Lulin	LUSS	·	820 m	MPC · JPL
410169	2007 PS_{13}	—	August 8, 2007	Socorro	LINEAR	·	660 m	MPC · JPL
410170	2007 PZ_{28}	—	August 14, 2007	Siding Spring	SSS	PHO	1.0 km	MPC · JPL
410171	2007 PL_{36}	—	August 13, 2007	Socorro	LINEAR	·	1.0 km	MPC · JPL
410172	2007 PR_{37}	—	August 13, 2007	Socorro	LINEAR	·	960 m	MPC · JPL
410173	2007 PB_{42}	—	August 9, 2007	Socorro	LINEAR	·	830 m	MPC · JPL
410174	2007 PN_{47}	—	December 2, 2004	Kitt Peak	Spacewatch	NYS	820 m	MPC · JPL
410175	2007 QW_{6}	—	August 21, 2007	Anderson Mesa	LONEOS	·	800 m	MPC · JPL
410176	2007 QE_{8}	—	August 21, 2007	Anderson Mesa	LONEOS	·	750 m	MPC · JPL
410177	2007 QG_{10}	—	August 23, 2007	Kitt Peak	Spacewatch	·	650 m	MPC · JPL
410178	2007 QF_{17}	—	August 22, 2007	Socorro	LINEAR	·	680 m	MPC · JPL
410179	2007 RZ_{1}	—	September 2, 2007	Siding Spring	K. Sárneczky, L. Kiss	·	740 m	MPC · JPL
410180	2007 RD_{6}	—	September 5, 2007	Dauban	Chante-Perdrix	·	790 m	MPC · JPL
410181	2007 RL_{51}	—	September 9, 2007	Kitt Peak	Spacewatch	·	760 m	MPC · JPL
410182	2007 RA_{60}	—	February 24, 2006	Kitt Peak	Spacewatch	·	730 m	MPC · JPL
410183	2007 RM_{67}	—	September 10, 2007	Mount Lemmon	Mount Lemmon Survey	·	610 m	MPC · JPL
410184	2007 RP_{78}	—	September 10, 2007	Mount Lemmon	Mount Lemmon Survey	·	700 m	MPC · JPL
410185	2007 RZ_{80}	—	September 10, 2007	Catalina	CSS	·	990 m	MPC · JPL
410186	2007 RH_{103}	—	September 11, 2007	Catalina	CSS	·	750 m	MPC · JPL
410187	2007 RK_{103}	—	September 2, 2007	Catalina	CSS	·	1.1 km	MPC · JPL
410188	2007 RY_{106}	—	September 11, 2007	Mount Lemmon	Mount Lemmon Survey	·	770 m	MPC · JPL
410189	2007 RL_{109}	—	September 11, 2007	Kitt Peak	Spacewatch	·	590 m	MPC · JPL
410190	2007 RE_{114}	—	September 11, 2007	Kitt Peak	Spacewatch	V	750 m	MPC · JPL
410191	2007 RP_{117}	—	September 11, 2007	Kitt Peak	Spacewatch	·	800 m	MPC · JPL
410192	2007 RF_{128}	—	September 12, 2007	Mount Lemmon	Mount Lemmon Survey	·	880 m	MPC · JPL
410193	2007 RG_{133}	—	September 15, 2007	Taunus	E. Schwab, R. Kling	·	850 m	MPC · JPL
410194	2007 RR_{138}	—	September 14, 2007	Anderson Mesa	LONEOS	·	900 m	MPC · JPL
410195	2007 RT_{147}	—	September 11, 2007	XuYi	PMO NEO Survey Program	AMO	750 m	MPC · JPL
410196	2007 RL_{150}	—	September 14, 2007	Catalina	CSS	·	820 m	MPC · JPL
410197	2007 RS_{150}	—	August 24, 2007	Kitt Peak	Spacewatch	·	580 m	MPC · JPL
410198	2007 RG_{151}	—	April 7, 2003	Kitt Peak	Spacewatch	·	630 m	MPC · JPL
410199	2007 RO_{163}	—	September 10, 2007	Kitt Peak	Spacewatch	·	720 m	MPC · JPL
410200	2007 RP_{175}	—	September 10, 2007	Kitt Peak	Spacewatch	·	700 m	MPC · JPL

== 410201–410300 ==
back to top

Designation			Discovery			Properties		Ref
Permanent	Provisional	Named after	Date	Site	Discoverer(s)	Category	Diam.	Ref
410201	2007 RE_{191}	—	September 11, 2007	Kitt Peak	Spacewatch	·	870 m	MPC · JPL
410202	2007 RF_{200}	—	September 13, 2007	Kitt Peak	Spacewatch	·	1.1 km	MPC · JPL
410203	2007 RZ_{206}	—	September 10, 2007	Kitt Peak	Spacewatch	·	870 m	MPC · JPL
410204	2007 RK_{207}	—	September 10, 2007	Kitt Peak	Spacewatch	·	820 m	MPC · JPL
410205	2007 RM_{210}	—	September 11, 2007	Kitt Peak	Spacewatch	·	680 m	MPC · JPL
410206	2007 RT_{211}	—	September 11, 2007	Kitt Peak	Spacewatch	·	800 m	MPC · JPL
410207	2007 RS_{217}	—	September 13, 2007	Kitt Peak	Spacewatch	·	940 m	MPC · JPL
410208	2007 RP_{233}	—	September 12, 2007	Catalina	CSS	·	740 m	MPC · JPL
410209	2007 RW_{235}	—	September 12, 2007	Mount Lemmon	Mount Lemmon Survey	·	990 m	MPC · JPL
410210	2007 RM_{236}	—	September 13, 2007	Anderson Mesa	LONEOS	·	680 m	MPC · JPL
410211	2007 RC_{263}	—	September 15, 2007	Mount Lemmon	Mount Lemmon Survey	·	830 m	MPC · JPL
410212	2007 RD_{265}	—	September 15, 2007	Mount Lemmon	Mount Lemmon Survey	·	1.6 km	MPC · JPL
410213	2007 RA_{271}	—	September 15, 2007	Kitt Peak	Spacewatch	·	960 m	MPC · JPL
410214	2007 RW_{273}	—	September 15, 2007	Kitt Peak	Spacewatch	·	1.2 km	MPC · JPL
410215	2007 RG_{285}	—	September 13, 2007	Mount Lemmon	Mount Lemmon Survey	(2076)	880 m	MPC · JPL
410216	2007 RG_{288}	—	September 12, 2007	Mount Lemmon	Mount Lemmon Survey	·	870 m	MPC · JPL
410217	2007 RB_{295}	—	September 14, 2007	Mount Lemmon	Mount Lemmon Survey	·	870 m	MPC · JPL
410218	2007 RK_{295}	—	September 14, 2007	Mount Lemmon	Mount Lemmon Survey	·	880 m	MPC · JPL
410219	2007 RM_{310}	—	September 5, 2007	Catalina	CSS	·	1.2 km	MPC · JPL
410220	2007 RX_{310}	—	September 13, 2007	Catalina	CSS	·	1.2 km	MPC · JPL
410221	2007 RR_{313}	—	September 12, 2007	Catalina	CSS	·	780 m	MPC · JPL
410222	2007 RN_{319}	—	September 12, 2007	Mount Lemmon	Mount Lemmon Survey	·	880 m	MPC · JPL
410223	2007 RB_{321}	—	September 13, 2007	Socorro	LINEAR	·	900 m	MPC · JPL
410224	2007 SA_{7}	—	September 18, 2007	Mount Lemmon	Mount Lemmon Survey	·	790 m	MPC · JPL
410225	2007 SN_{15}	—	September 10, 2007	Mount Lemmon	Mount Lemmon Survey	·	1.3 km	MPC · JPL
410226	2007 SV_{19}	—	September 18, 2007	Mount Lemmon	Mount Lemmon Survey	·	970 m	MPC · JPL
410227	2007 SA_{20}	—	September 25, 2007	Mount Lemmon	Mount Lemmon Survey	·	1.3 km	MPC · JPL
410228	2007 SE_{20}	—	September 25, 2007	Mount Lemmon	Mount Lemmon Survey	·	1.0 km	MPC · JPL
410229	2007 TO_{2}	—	October 2, 2007	Majdanak	Majdanak	·	600 m	MPC · JPL
410230	2007 TH_{8}	—	October 5, 2007	Bisei SG Center	BATTeRS	·	750 m	MPC · JPL
410231	2007 TO_{9}	—	September 9, 2007	Mount Lemmon	Mount Lemmon Survey	·	1.3 km	MPC · JPL
410232	2007 TR_{15}	—	October 4, 2007	Catalina	CSS	·	820 m	MPC · JPL
410233	2007 TU_{16}	—	September 20, 2007	Catalina	CSS	·	1.1 km	MPC · JPL
410234	2007 TM_{18}	—	March 24, 2006	Kitt Peak	Spacewatch	·	1.1 km	MPC · JPL
410235	2007 TL_{24}	—	September 11, 2007	Kitt Peak	Spacewatch	CYB	4.0 km	MPC · JPL
410236	2007 TN_{25}	—	October 4, 2007	Kitt Peak	Spacewatch	·	660 m	MPC · JPL
410237	2007 TQ_{28}	—	October 4, 2007	Kitt Peak	Spacewatch	·	1.0 km	MPC · JPL
410238	2007 TP_{33}	—	October 6, 2007	Kitt Peak	Spacewatch	·	630 m	MPC · JPL
410239	2007 TJ_{34}	—	October 6, 2007	Kitt Peak	Spacewatch	·	730 m	MPC · JPL
410240	2007 TG_{39}	—	October 6, 2007	Kitt Peak	Spacewatch	·	1.3 km	MPC · JPL
410241	2007 TP_{42}	—	October 7, 2007	Mount Lemmon	Mount Lemmon Survey	EUP	3.8 km	MPC · JPL
410242	2007 TD_{44}	—	October 7, 2007	Kitt Peak	Spacewatch	·	1.1 km	MPC · JPL
410243	2007 TN_{61}	—	October 7, 2007	Mount Lemmon	Mount Lemmon Survey	·	940 m	MPC · JPL
410244	2007 TH_{63}	—	October 7, 2007	Mount Lemmon	Mount Lemmon Survey	V	500 m	MPC · JPL
410245	2007 TN_{64}	—	March 25, 2006	Kitt Peak	Spacewatch	·	1.1 km	MPC · JPL
410246	2007 TL_{67}	—	October 7, 2007	Catalina	CSS	V	650 m	MPC · JPL
410247	2007 TB_{72}	—	October 14, 2007	Bergisch Gladbach	W. Bickel	·	840 m	MPC · JPL
410248	2007 TY_{72}	—	October 12, 2007	Socorro	LINEAR	·	1.0 km	MPC · JPL
410249	2007 TX_{80}	—	October 7, 2007	Mount Lemmon	Mount Lemmon Survey	·	730 m	MPC · JPL
410250	2007 TF_{93}	—	October 6, 2007	Kitt Peak	Spacewatch	NYS	1.1 km	MPC · JPL
410251	2007 TE_{95}	—	October 7, 2007	Catalina	CSS	·	890 m	MPC · JPL
410252	2007 TB_{106}	—	September 25, 2007	Mount Lemmon	Mount Lemmon Survey	·	750 m	MPC · JPL
410253	2007 TA_{109}	—	October 7, 2007	Catalina	CSS	·	910 m	MPC · JPL
410254	2007 TH_{111}	—	October 8, 2007	Catalina	CSS	(2076)	740 m	MPC · JPL
410255	2007 TV_{111}	—	October 8, 2007	Catalina	CSS	·	1.0 km	MPC · JPL
410256	2007 TY_{111}	—	October 8, 2007	Catalina	CSS	·	840 m	MPC · JPL
410257	2007 TY_{115}	—	October 8, 2007	Mount Lemmon	Mount Lemmon Survey	·	910 m	MPC · JPL
410258	2007 TN_{116}	—	October 9, 2007	Kitt Peak	Spacewatch	(2076)	720 m	MPC · JPL
410259	2007 TQ_{120}	—	October 4, 2007	Kitt Peak	Spacewatch	·	740 m	MPC · JPL
410260	2007 TS_{120}	—	October 4, 2007	Kitt Peak	Spacewatch	·	810 m	MPC · JPL
410261	2007 TK_{121}	—	October 5, 2007	Kitt Peak	Spacewatch	·	1.8 km	MPC · JPL
410262	2007 TX_{124}	—	September 15, 2007	Mount Lemmon	Mount Lemmon Survey	·	790 m	MPC · JPL
410263	2007 TF_{131}	—	October 7, 2007	Mount Lemmon	Mount Lemmon Survey	·	730 m	MPC · JPL
410264	2007 TR_{133}	—	October 7, 2007	Mount Lemmon	Mount Lemmon Survey	·	1.3 km	MPC · JPL
410265	2007 TS_{134}	—	October 8, 2007	Kitt Peak	Spacewatch	·	800 m	MPC · JPL
410266	2007 TU_{135}	—	October 8, 2007	Kitt Peak	Spacewatch	·	1.2 km	MPC · JPL
410267	2007 TV_{141}	—	October 9, 2007	Mount Lemmon	Mount Lemmon Survey	(2076)	780 m	MPC · JPL
410268	2007 TJ_{142}	—	October 8, 2007	Catalina	CSS	PHO	810 m	MPC · JPL
410269	2007 TB_{147}	—	October 7, 2007	Socorro	LINEAR	·	1.1 km	MPC · JPL
410270	2007 TB_{148}	—	January 15, 2005	Socorro	LINEAR	·	900 m	MPC · JPL
410271	2007 TZ_{151}	—	September 13, 2007	Catalina	CSS	·	800 m	MPC · JPL
410272	2007 TN_{155}	—	October 9, 2007	Socorro	LINEAR	·	1.2 km	MPC · JPL
410273	2007 TB_{160}	—	October 7, 2007	Kitt Peak	Spacewatch	·	1.2 km	MPC · JPL
410274	2007 TX_{160}	—	October 9, 2007	Socorro	LINEAR	·	750 m	MPC · JPL
410275	2007 TH_{164}	—	September 13, 2007	Mount Lemmon	Mount Lemmon Survey	MAS	560 m	MPC · JPL
410276	2007 TE_{172}	—	September 8, 2007	Mount Lemmon	Mount Lemmon Survey	·	720 m	MPC · JPL
410277	2007 TJ_{176}	—	October 5, 2007	Kitt Peak	Spacewatch	·	660 m	MPC · JPL
410278	2007 TZ_{176}	—	October 6, 2007	Kitt Peak	Spacewatch	·	1.2 km	MPC · JPL
410279	2007 TV_{182}	—	October 8, 2007	Mount Lemmon	Mount Lemmon Survey	·	1.2 km	MPC · JPL
410280	2007 TH_{195}	—	October 7, 2007	Mount Lemmon	Mount Lemmon Survey	·	950 m	MPC · JPL
410281	2007 TD_{196}	—	October 7, 2007	Mount Lemmon	Mount Lemmon Survey	·	1.0 km	MPC · JPL
410282	2007 TR_{201}	—	October 8, 2007	Mount Lemmon	Mount Lemmon Survey	NYS	970 m	MPC · JPL
410283	2007 TH_{202}	—	October 8, 2007	Mount Lemmon	Mount Lemmon Survey	·	1.3 km	MPC · JPL
410284	2007 TA_{203}	—	October 8, 2007	Mount Lemmon	Mount Lemmon Survey	MAS	730 m	MPC · JPL
410285	2007 TD_{211}	—	September 25, 2007	Mount Lemmon	Mount Lemmon Survey	·	900 m	MPC · JPL
410286	2007 TB_{213}	—	October 7, 2007	Kitt Peak	Spacewatch	·	1.0 km	MPC · JPL
410287	2007 TQ_{215}	—	October 7, 2007	Kitt Peak	Spacewatch	·	890 m	MPC · JPL
410288	2007 TP_{221}	—	October 9, 2007	Kitt Peak	Spacewatch	·	800 m	MPC · JPL
410289	2007 TJ_{227}	—	October 8, 2007	Kitt Peak	Spacewatch	V	710 m	MPC · JPL
410290	2007 TK_{229}	—	September 9, 2007	Mount Lemmon	Mount Lemmon Survey	·	880 m	MPC · JPL
410291	2007 TM_{237}	—	October 9, 2007	Mount Lemmon	Mount Lemmon Survey	·	790 m	MPC · JPL
410292	2007 TU_{253}	—	October 8, 2007	Mount Lemmon	Mount Lemmon Survey	·	750 m	MPC · JPL
410293	2007 TE_{263}	—	October 10, 2007	Kitt Peak	Spacewatch	NYS	1.1 km	MPC · JPL
410294	2007 TP_{275}	—	September 12, 2007	Anderson Mesa	LONEOS	·	730 m	MPC · JPL
410295	2007 TP_{281}	—	October 7, 2007	Catalina	CSS	·	1.1 km	MPC · JPL
410296	2007 TM_{310}	—	October 11, 2007	Kitt Peak	Spacewatch	·	1.1 km	MPC · JPL
410297	2007 TJ_{317}	—	October 12, 2007	Kitt Peak	Spacewatch	·	610 m	MPC · JPL
410298	2007 TG_{328}	—	October 11, 2007	Kitt Peak	Spacewatch	·	830 m	MPC · JPL
410299	2007 TC_{337}	—	October 12, 2007	Kitt Peak	Spacewatch	·	890 m	MPC · JPL
410300	2007 TD_{346}	—	October 13, 2007	Mount Lemmon	Mount Lemmon Survey	·	890 m	MPC · JPL

== 410301–410400 ==
back to top

Designation			Discovery			Properties		Ref
Permanent	Provisional	Named after	Date	Site	Discoverer(s)	Category	Diam.	Ref
410301	2007 TW_{352}	—	October 14, 2007	Mount Lemmon	Mount Lemmon Survey	·	500 m	MPC · JPL
410302	2007 TR_{361}	—	October 9, 2007	Anderson Mesa	LONEOS	·	1.3 km	MPC · JPL
410303	2007 TY_{361}	—	October 14, 2007	Mount Lemmon	Mount Lemmon Survey	·	840 m	MPC · JPL
410304	2007 TW_{362}	—	October 14, 2007	Mount Lemmon	Mount Lemmon Survey	·	860 m	MPC · JPL
410305	2007 TO_{369}	—	October 11, 2007	Kitt Peak	Spacewatch	·	970 m	MPC · JPL
410306	2007 TX_{381}	—	October 14, 2007	Kitt Peak	Spacewatch	·	870 m	MPC · JPL
410307	2007 TX_{383}	—	October 14, 2007	Kitt Peak	Spacewatch	MAS	680 m	MPC · JPL
410308	2007 TM_{386}	—	October 15, 2007	Catalina	CSS	·	1.1 km	MPC · JPL
410309	2007 TT_{400}	—	September 18, 2007	Mount Lemmon	Mount Lemmon Survey	·	710 m	MPC · JPL
410310	2007 TU_{402}	—	October 15, 2007	Mount Lemmon	Mount Lemmon Survey	·	750 m	MPC · JPL
410311	2007 TK_{404}	—	March 17, 2005	Kitt Peak	Spacewatch	NYS	1.2 km	MPC · JPL
410312	2007 TZ_{408}	—	October 15, 2007	Catalina	CSS	NYS	910 m	MPC · JPL
410313	2007 TL_{410}	—	October 13, 2007	Catalina	CSS	·	990 m	MPC · JPL
410314	2007 TE_{425}	—	October 8, 2007	Mount Lemmon	Mount Lemmon Survey	·	1.2 km	MPC · JPL
410315	2007 TH_{425}	—	October 8, 2007	Mount Lemmon	Mount Lemmon Survey	(2076)	890 m	MPC · JPL
410316	2007 TT_{428}	—	October 11, 2007	Kitt Peak	Spacewatch	·	960 m	MPC · JPL
410317	2007 TH_{434}	—	October 8, 2007	Anderson Mesa	LONEOS	·	1.0 km	MPC · JPL
410318	2007 TY_{434}	—	October 12, 2007	Catalina	CSS	·	780 m	MPC · JPL
410319	2007 TP_{435}	—	October 14, 2007	Kitt Peak	Spacewatch	·	1.2 km	MPC · JPL
410320	2007 TG_{441}	—	October 8, 2007	Catalina	CSS	·	1.5 km	MPC · JPL
410321	2007 TT_{452}	—	October 12, 2007	Mount Lemmon	Mount Lemmon Survey	·	1.0 km	MPC · JPL
410322	2007 TE_{453}	—	October 15, 2007	Mount Lemmon	Mount Lemmon Survey	MAS	690 m	MPC · JPL
410323	2007 UK_{2}	—	October 18, 2007	Mayhill	Lowe, A.	·	2.2 km	MPC · JPL
410324	2007 UX_{6}	—	October 20, 2007	Siding Spring	K. Sárneczky, L. Kiss	·	1.3 km	MPC · JPL
410325	2007 UX_{9}	—	October 8, 2007	Anderson Mesa	LONEOS	·	900 m	MPC · JPL
410326	2007 UQ_{11}	—	October 19, 2007	Socorro	LINEAR	·	1.0 km	MPC · JPL
410327	2007 UT_{12}	—	October 16, 2007	Kleť	Kleť	MAS	700 m	MPC · JPL
410328	2007 UQ_{21}	—	October 16, 2007	Kitt Peak	Spacewatch	·	970 m	MPC · JPL
410329	2007 UL_{22}	—	September 15, 2007	Mount Lemmon	Mount Lemmon Survey	·	710 m	MPC · JPL
410330	2007 US_{29}	—	October 9, 2007	Mount Lemmon	Mount Lemmon Survey	·	690 m	MPC · JPL
410331	2007 UR_{47}	—	October 19, 2007	Catalina	CSS	·	1.1 km	MPC · JPL
410332	2007 UP_{50}	—	October 24, 2007	Mount Lemmon	Mount Lemmon Survey	·	1.3 km	MPC · JPL
410333	2007 US_{52}	—	October 24, 2007	Mount Lemmon	Mount Lemmon Survey	·	1.6 km	MPC · JPL
410334	2007 UB_{57}	—	September 10, 2007	Mount Lemmon	Mount Lemmon Survey	V	910 m	MPC · JPL
410335	2007 UQ_{61}	—	October 30, 2007	Kitt Peak	Spacewatch	·	980 m	MPC · JPL
410336	2007 UO_{65}	—	October 31, 2007	Catalina	CSS	·	940 m	MPC · JPL
410337	2007 UW_{67}	—	October 30, 2007	Mount Lemmon	Mount Lemmon Survey	·	910 m	MPC · JPL
410338	2007 US_{73}	—	October 31, 2007	Mount Lemmon	Mount Lemmon Survey	·	900 m	MPC · JPL
410339	2007 UV_{75}	—	October 31, 2007	Mount Lemmon	Mount Lemmon Survey	·	800 m	MPC · JPL
410340	2007 UZ_{76}	—	October 31, 2007	Mount Lemmon	Mount Lemmon Survey	·	760 m	MPC · JPL
410341	2007 UB_{79}	—	September 18, 2007	Mount Lemmon	Mount Lemmon Survey	·	1.1 km	MPC · JPL
410342	2007 UX_{89}	—	October 21, 2007	Kitt Peak	Spacewatch	·	870 m	MPC · JPL
410343	2007 UT_{90}	—	October 30, 2007	Mount Lemmon	Mount Lemmon Survey	MAS	730 m	MPC · JPL
410344	2007 UM_{103}	—	October 17, 2007	Mount Lemmon	Mount Lemmon Survey	NYS	890 m	MPC · JPL
410345	2007 UR_{103}	—	October 2, 2003	Kitt Peak	Spacewatch	·	1.1 km	MPC · JPL
410346	2007 UX_{105}	—	October 30, 2007	Kitt Peak	Spacewatch	·	1.1 km	MPC · JPL
410347	2007 UA_{120}	—	October 30, 2007	Mount Lemmon	Mount Lemmon Survey	·	770 m	MPC · JPL
410348	2007 UF_{124}	—	October 4, 2007	Kitt Peak	Spacewatch	·	1.1 km	MPC · JPL
410349	2007 UZ_{128}	—	October 30, 2007	Kitt Peak	Spacewatch	·	890 m	MPC · JPL
410350	2007 UD_{135}	—	October 31, 2007	Kitt Peak	Spacewatch	·	1.2 km	MPC · JPL
410351	2007 VJ_{5}	—	November 3, 2007	Dauban	Chante-Perdrix	·	1.3 km	MPC · JPL
410352	2007 VC_{11}	—	November 2, 2007	Kitt Peak	Spacewatch	·	1.1 km	MPC · JPL
410353	2007 VE_{11}	—	November 2, 2007	Mount Lemmon	Mount Lemmon Survey	·	810 m	MPC · JPL
410354	2007 VK_{12}	—	August 22, 2007	Anderson Mesa	LONEOS	·	840 m	MPC · JPL
410355	2007 VP_{29}	—	November 5, 2007	Kitt Peak	Spacewatch	·	1.1 km	MPC · JPL
410356	2007 VW_{29}	—	November 1, 2007	Kitt Peak	Spacewatch	ERI	1.6 km	MPC · JPL
410357	2007 VW_{43}	—	November 1, 2007	Kitt Peak	Spacewatch	·	920 m	MPC · JPL
410358	2007 VW_{48}	—	November 1, 2007	Kitt Peak	Spacewatch	·	1.0 km	MPC · JPL
410359	2007 VL_{51}	—	November 1, 2007	Kitt Peak	Spacewatch	·	1.0 km	MPC · JPL
410360	2007 VY_{51}	—	November 1, 2007	Kitt Peak	Spacewatch	·	1.2 km	MPC · JPL
410361	2007 VT_{54}	—	November 1, 2007	Kitt Peak	Spacewatch	NYS	910 m	MPC · JPL
410362	2007 VN_{61}	—	November 1, 2007	Kitt Peak	Spacewatch	·	1.3 km	MPC · JPL
410363	2007 VG_{64}	—	November 1, 2007	Kitt Peak	Spacewatch	·	1.2 km	MPC · JPL
410364	2007 VM_{76}	—	November 3, 2007	Kitt Peak	Spacewatch	·	1.2 km	MPC · JPL
410365	2007 VY_{81}	—	October 6, 2007	Kitt Peak	Spacewatch	NYS	1.1 km	MPC · JPL
410366	2007 VV_{90}	—	November 5, 2007	Kitt Peak	Spacewatch	·	980 m	MPC · JPL
410367	2007 VZ_{144}	—	November 4, 2007	Kitt Peak	Spacewatch	NYS	1.1 km	MPC · JPL
410368	2007 VQ_{145}	—	November 4, 2007	Kitt Peak	Spacewatch	·	1.2 km	MPC · JPL
410369	2007 VP_{150}	—	October 4, 2007	Kitt Peak	Spacewatch	NYS	750 m	MPC · JPL
410370	2007 VN_{153}	—	November 4, 2007	Kitt Peak	Spacewatch	·	640 m	MPC · JPL
410371	2007 VQ_{156}	—	November 5, 2007	Mount Lemmon	Mount Lemmon Survey	·	1.0 km	MPC · JPL
410372	2007 VC_{158}	—	October 20, 2007	Mount Lemmon	Mount Lemmon Survey	·	740 m	MPC · JPL
410373	2007 VL_{168}	—	September 15, 2007	Mount Lemmon	Mount Lemmon Survey	·	1.1 km	MPC · JPL
410374	2007 VD_{176}	—	October 8, 2007	Mount Lemmon	Mount Lemmon Survey	3:2	5.0 km	MPC · JPL
410375	2007 VP_{180}	—	November 7, 2007	Catalina	CSS	·	1.5 km	MPC · JPL
410376	2007 VE_{198}	—	November 8, 2007	Mount Lemmon	Mount Lemmon Survey	·	1 km	MPC · JPL
410377	2007 VK_{216}	—	November 9, 2007	Kitt Peak	Spacewatch	·	1.1 km	MPC · JPL
410378	2007 VW_{216}	—	November 1, 2007	Kitt Peak	Spacewatch	·	1.1 km	MPC · JPL
410379	2007 VL_{220}	—	November 9, 2007	Kitt Peak	Spacewatch	·	1.1 km	MPC · JPL
410380	2007 VO_{237}	—	November 11, 2007	Mount Lemmon	Mount Lemmon Survey	·	1.2 km	MPC · JPL
410381	2007 VF_{238}	—	September 14, 2007	Mount Lemmon	Mount Lemmon Survey	·	1.1 km	MPC · JPL
410382	2007 VT_{267}	—	November 7, 2007	Socorro	LINEAR	·	730 m	MPC · JPL
410383	2007 VO_{268}	—	October 8, 2007	Kitt Peak	Spacewatch	NYS	750 m	MPC · JPL
410384	2007 VK_{275}	—	October 16, 2007	Mount Lemmon	Mount Lemmon Survey	·	2.5 km	MPC · JPL
410385	2007 VG_{276}	—	November 13, 2007	Mount Lemmon	Mount Lemmon Survey	HNS	1.2 km	MPC · JPL
410386	2007 VJ_{282}	—	November 14, 2007	Kitt Peak	Spacewatch	3:2	3.9 km	MPC · JPL
410387	2007 VC_{287}	—	November 2, 2007	Mount Lemmon	Mount Lemmon Survey	V	790 m	MPC · JPL
410388	2007 VT_{310}	—	November 11, 2007	Mount Lemmon	Mount Lemmon Survey	MAS	1 km	MPC · JPL
410389	2007 VJ_{312}	—	November 3, 2007	Mount Lemmon	Mount Lemmon Survey	·	1.3 km	MPC · JPL
410390	2007 VU_{324}	—	November 8, 2007	Catalina	CSS	·	990 m	MPC · JPL
410391	2007 WV	—	November 17, 2007	La Sagra	OAM	3:2	6.1 km	MPC · JPL
410392	2007 WD_{4}	—	September 14, 2007	Mount Lemmon	Mount Lemmon Survey	·	1 km	MPC · JPL
410393	2007 WR_{11}	—	November 9, 2007	Catalina	CSS	·	1.1 km	MPC · JPL
410394	2007 WH_{20}	—	November 18, 2007	Mount Lemmon	Mount Lemmon Survey	·	1.2 km	MPC · JPL
410395	2007 WN_{20}	—	November 9, 2007	Mount Lemmon	Mount Lemmon Survey	H	760 m	MPC · JPL
410396	2007 WL_{41}	—	May 24, 2006	Mount Lemmon	Mount Lemmon Survey	V	610 m	MPC · JPL
410397	2007 WB_{46}	—	November 20, 2007	Mount Lemmon	Mount Lemmon Survey	·	1.4 km	MPC · JPL
410398	2007 XX_{5}	—	November 3, 2007	Mount Lemmon	Mount Lemmon Survey	·	830 m	MPC · JPL
410399	2007 XJ_{9}	—	October 20, 2003	Kitt Peak	Spacewatch	NYS	980 m	MPC · JPL
410400	2007 XX_{20}	—	November 17, 2007	Kitt Peak	Spacewatch	·	840 m	MPC · JPL

== 410401–410500 ==
back to top

Designation			Discovery			Properties		Ref
Permanent	Provisional	Named after	Date	Site	Discoverer(s)	Category	Diam.	Ref
410401	2007 XZ_{21}	—	November 19, 2007	Kitt Peak	Spacewatch	·	1.5 km	MPC · JPL
410402	2007 XR_{22}	—	December 10, 2007	Socorro	LINEAR	·	1.3 km	MPC · JPL
410403	2007 XT_{24}	—	December 15, 2007	Saint-Sulpice	B. Christophe	·	990 m	MPC · JPL
410404	2007 XH_{30}	—	December 15, 2007	Kitt Peak	Spacewatch	3:2 · SHU	5.4 km	MPC · JPL
410405	2007 XR_{30}	—	December 4, 2007	Mount Lemmon	Mount Lemmon Survey	MAS	740 m	MPC · JPL
410406	2007 XR_{42}	—	December 15, 2007	Kitt Peak	Spacewatch	NYS	1.1 km	MPC · JPL
410407	2007 XW_{51}	—	December 5, 2007	Kitt Peak	Spacewatch	·	1.3 km	MPC · JPL
410408	2007 XP_{56}	—	December 3, 2007	Kitt Peak	Spacewatch	·	1.1 km	MPC · JPL
410409	2007 YK_{9}	—	December 16, 2007	Mount Lemmon	Mount Lemmon Survey	·	1.5 km	MPC · JPL
410410	2007 YF_{12}	—	December 17, 2007	Mount Lemmon	Mount Lemmon Survey	·	1.5 km	MPC · JPL
410411	2007 YS_{36}	—	November 3, 2007	Mount Lemmon	Mount Lemmon Survey	V	680 m	MPC · JPL
410412	2007 YT_{50}	—	December 28, 2007	Kitt Peak	Spacewatch	·	1.7 km	MPC · JPL
410413	2007 YQ_{51}	—	December 30, 2007	Kitt Peak	Spacewatch	·	1.0 km	MPC · JPL
410414	2007 YE_{67}	—	December 31, 2007	Kitt Peak	Spacewatch	·	1.5 km	MPC · JPL
410415	2007 YZ_{70}	—	December 16, 2007	Socorro	LINEAR	·	1.4 km	MPC · JPL
410416	2008 AY_{31}	—	January 12, 2008	La Sagra	OAM	·	1.3 km	MPC · JPL
410417	2008 AY_{33}	—	January 10, 2008	Mount Lemmon	Mount Lemmon Survey	·	900 m	MPC · JPL
410418	2008 AW_{34}	—	November 8, 2007	Mount Lemmon	Mount Lemmon Survey	NYS	1.2 km	MPC · JPL
410419	2008 AA_{36}	—	January 10, 2008	Kitt Peak	Spacewatch	·	1.2 km	MPC · JPL
410420	2008 AZ_{37}	—	January 10, 2008	Mount Lemmon	Mount Lemmon Survey	·	930 m	MPC · JPL
410421	2008 AY_{40}	—	December 19, 2007	Mount Lemmon	Mount Lemmon Survey	EUN	1.1 km	MPC · JPL
410422	2008 AG_{44}	—	January 10, 2008	Kitt Peak	Spacewatch	·	1.5 km	MPC · JPL
410423	2008 AV_{65}	—	January 11, 2008	Kitt Peak	Spacewatch	·	1.5 km	MPC · JPL
410424	2008 AV_{86}	—	January 11, 2008	Catalina	CSS	·	1.2 km	MPC · JPL
410425	2008 AH_{91}	—	December 30, 2007	Kitt Peak	Spacewatch	·	1.2 km	MPC · JPL
410426	2008 AY_{104}	—	January 15, 2008	Kitt Peak	Spacewatch	MAS	660 m	MPC · JPL
410427	2008 BH_{3}	—	November 11, 2007	Mount Lemmon	Mount Lemmon Survey	·	1.3 km	MPC · JPL
410428	2008 BJ_{15}	—	January 29, 2008	Vail-Jarnac	Jarnac	ADE	3.4 km	MPC · JPL
410429	2008 BQ_{18}	—	December 30, 2007	Catalina	CSS	·	1.6 km	MPC · JPL
410430	2008 BC_{19}	—	December 17, 2007	Kitt Peak	Spacewatch	(5)	1.5 km	MPC · JPL
410431	2008 BT_{19}	—	January 30, 2008	Kitt Peak	Spacewatch	NYS	1.1 km	MPC · JPL
410432	2008 BM_{25}	—	November 16, 1995	Kitt Peak	Spacewatch	·	1.1 km	MPC · JPL
410433	2008 BY_{30}	—	January 30, 2008	Mount Lemmon	Mount Lemmon Survey	MAS	890 m	MPC · JPL
410434	2008 BZ_{31}	—	January 30, 2008	Mount Lemmon	Mount Lemmon Survey	MAS	760 m	MPC · JPL
410435	2008 BU_{41}	—	January 30, 2008	Catalina	CSS	·	1.4 km	MPC · JPL
410436	2008 BX_{45}	—	January 18, 2008	Kitt Peak	Spacewatch	·	1.7 km	MPC · JPL
410437	2008 BM_{46}	—	January 30, 2008	Catalina	CSS	NYS	1.2 km	MPC · JPL
410438	2008 BA_{51}	—	January 31, 2008	Mount Lemmon	Mount Lemmon Survey	·	1.3 km	MPC · JPL
410439	2008 BL_{51}	—	January 16, 2008	Mount Lemmon	Mount Lemmon Survey	·	1.5 km	MPC · JPL
410440	2008 CX_{6}	—	December 31, 2007	Mount Lemmon	Mount Lemmon Survey	·	1.1 km	MPC · JPL
410441	2008 CP_{12}	—	February 3, 2008	Kitt Peak	Spacewatch	(5)	930 m	MPC · JPL
410442	2008 CB_{23}	—	February 1, 2008	Kitt Peak	Spacewatch	·	1.9 km	MPC · JPL
410443	2008 CF_{30}	—	February 2, 2008	Kitt Peak	Spacewatch	·	860 m	MPC · JPL
410444	2008 CC_{44}	—	February 2, 2008	Kitt Peak	Spacewatch	·	1.3 km	MPC · JPL
410445	2008 CZ_{59}	—	February 7, 2008	Kitt Peak	Spacewatch	·	1.5 km	MPC · JPL
410446	2008 CF_{66}	—	February 8, 2008	Mount Lemmon	Mount Lemmon Survey	MIS	2.6 km	MPC · JPL
410447	2008 CU_{71}	—	February 7, 2008	Catalina	CSS	·	1.2 km	MPC · JPL
410448	2008 CE_{72}	—	February 10, 2008	Taunus	R. Kling, Zimmer, U.	·	1.1 km	MPC · JPL
410449	2008 CZ_{79}	—	February 7, 2008	Kitt Peak	Spacewatch	·	1.6 km	MPC · JPL
410450	2008 CR_{86}	—	February 7, 2008	Mount Lemmon	Mount Lemmon Survey	·	940 m	MPC · JPL
410451	2008 CH_{106}	—	November 11, 2006	Mount Lemmon	Mount Lemmon Survey	·	1.5 km	MPC · JPL
410452	2008 CU_{108}	—	January 18, 2008	Mount Lemmon	Mount Lemmon Survey	·	1.3 km	MPC · JPL
410453	2008 CL_{109}	—	February 9, 2008	Kitt Peak	Spacewatch	EUN	1.5 km	MPC · JPL
410454	2008 CF_{117}	—	December 5, 2007	Mount Lemmon	Mount Lemmon Survey	·	1.8 km	MPC · JPL
410455	2008 CK_{123}	—	February 7, 2008	Mount Lemmon	Mount Lemmon Survey	·	2.0 km	MPC · JPL
410456	2008 CN_{123}	—	February 7, 2008	Mount Lemmon	Mount Lemmon Survey	MAR	1.1 km	MPC · JPL
410457	2008 CB_{133}	—	February 8, 2008	Kitt Peak	Spacewatch	·	1.6 km	MPC · JPL
410458	2008 CL_{144}	—	February 9, 2008	Anderson Mesa	LONEOS	·	1.3 km	MPC · JPL
410459	2008 CT_{150}	—	January 30, 2008	Kitt Peak	Spacewatch	·	1.3 km	MPC · JPL
410460	2008 CQ_{156}	—	February 9, 2008	Kitt Peak	Spacewatch	·	1.3 km	MPC · JPL
410461	2008 CJ_{179}	—	February 6, 2008	Catalina	CSS	JUN	1.1 km	MPC · JPL
410462	2008 CB_{180}	—	February 8, 2008	Catalina	CSS	·	2.5 km	MPC · JPL
410463	2008 CL_{180}	—	February 9, 2008	Catalina	CSS	·	1.4 km	MPC · JPL
410464	2008 CJ_{182}	—	December 20, 2007	Mount Lemmon	Mount Lemmon Survey	EUN	1.3 km	MPC · JPL
410465	2008 CW_{190}	—	February 1, 2008	Kitt Peak	Spacewatch	H	500 m	MPC · JPL
410466	2008 CM_{196}	—	February 13, 2008	Mount Lemmon	Mount Lemmon Survey	·	2.0 km	MPC · JPL
410467	2008 CO_{197}	—	February 9, 2008	Kitt Peak	Spacewatch	·	1.2 km	MPC · JPL
410468	2008 CB_{199}	—	February 13, 2008	Kitt Peak	Spacewatch	EUN	1.4 km	MPC · JPL
410469	2008 CX_{201}	—	February 10, 2008	Kitt Peak	Spacewatch	GEF	1.1 km	MPC · JPL
410470	2008 CH_{202}	—	February 7, 2008	Kitt Peak	Spacewatch	·	1.2 km	MPC · JPL
410471	2008 CZ_{207}	—	February 12, 2008	Kitt Peak	Spacewatch	·	1.1 km	MPC · JPL
410472	2008 CB_{212}	—	February 7, 2008	Socorro	LINEAR	·	1.8 km	MPC · JPL
410473	2008 CH_{212}	—	February 7, 2008	Mount Lemmon	Mount Lemmon Survey	·	1.4 km	MPC · JPL
410474	2008 CY_{214}	—	February 12, 2008	Kitt Peak	Spacewatch	·	920 m	MPC · JPL
410475 Robertschulz	2008 DN	Robertschulz	February 24, 2008	Gaisberg	Gierlinger, R.	·	1.3 km	MPC · JPL
410476	2008 DO_{4}	—	February 13, 2008	Catalina	CSS	H	630 m	MPC · JPL
410477	2008 DW_{11}	—	December 30, 2007	Mount Lemmon	Mount Lemmon Survey	·	1.1 km	MPC · JPL
410478	2008 DN_{12}	—	February 26, 2008	Kitt Peak	Spacewatch	MAR	810 m	MPC · JPL
410479	2008 DY_{13}	—	February 26, 2008	Mount Lemmon	Mount Lemmon Survey	·	1.0 km	MPC · JPL
410480	2008 DM_{17}	—	February 24, 2008	Kitt Peak	Spacewatch	·	1.0 km	MPC · JPL
410481	2008 DZ_{26}	—	January 19, 2008	Mount Lemmon	Mount Lemmon Survey	·	2.3 km	MPC · JPL
410482	2008 DP_{27}	—	February 29, 2008	Kitt Peak	Spacewatch	H	660 m	MPC · JPL
410483	2008 DF_{28}	—	February 24, 2008	Mount Lemmon	Mount Lemmon Survey	·	1.4 km	MPC · JPL
410484	2008 DG_{31}	—	February 8, 2008	Mount Lemmon	Mount Lemmon Survey	·	1.0 km	MPC · JPL
410485	2008 DU_{31}	—	February 27, 2008	Kitt Peak	Spacewatch	·	2.4 km	MPC · JPL
410486	2008 DE_{32}	—	February 27, 2008	Kitt Peak	Spacewatch	H	500 m	MPC · JPL
410487	2008 DE_{38}	—	February 27, 2008	Kitt Peak	Spacewatch	·	1.5 km	MPC · JPL
410488	2008 DJ_{44}	—	January 30, 2008	Kitt Peak	Spacewatch	·	1.2 km	MPC · JPL
410489	2008 DN_{54}	—	February 27, 2008	Catalina	CSS	·	2.0 km	MPC · JPL
410490	2008 DQ_{55}	—	February 27, 2008	Kitt Peak	Spacewatch	·	1.9 km	MPC · JPL
410491	2008 DF_{64}	—	February 28, 2008	Mount Lemmon	Mount Lemmon Survey	·	960 m	MPC · JPL
410492	2008 DQ_{67}	—	February 29, 2008	Kitt Peak	Spacewatch	·	1.5 km	MPC · JPL
410493	2008 DZ_{68}	—	February 29, 2008	Kitt Peak	Spacewatch	HNS	1.1 km	MPC · JPL
410494	2008 DG_{83}	—	February 28, 2008	Kitt Peak	Spacewatch	·	1.1 km	MPC · JPL
410495	2008 DR_{87}	—	February 28, 2008	Kitt Peak	Spacewatch	·	1.5 km	MPC · JPL
410496	2008 ES_{14}	—	March 1, 2008	Kitt Peak	Spacewatch	·	1.7 km	MPC · JPL
410497	2008 EG_{15}	—	March 1, 2008	Kitt Peak	Spacewatch	·	1.5 km	MPC · JPL
410498	2008 EC_{22}	—	March 2, 2008	Kitt Peak	Spacewatch	·	2.1 km	MPC · JPL
410499	2008 ES_{30}	—	March 5, 2008	Kitt Peak	Spacewatch	·	1.5 km	MPC · JPL
410500	2008 EX_{35}	—	March 3, 2008	Kitt Peak	Spacewatch	·	1.1 km	MPC · JPL

== 410501–410600 ==
back to top

Designation			Discovery			Properties		Ref
Permanent	Provisional	Named after	Date	Site	Discoverer(s)	Category	Diam.	Ref
410501	2008 EO_{42}	—	March 4, 2008	Mount Lemmon	Mount Lemmon Survey	·	1.6 km	MPC · JPL
410502	2008 EC_{44}	—	March 5, 2008	Catalina	CSS	H	570 m	MPC · JPL
410503	2008 EX_{54}	—	March 6, 2008	Kitt Peak	Spacewatch	EUN	1.2 km	MPC · JPL
410504	2008 EX_{73}	—	March 7, 2008	Kitt Peak	Spacewatch	·	1.8 km	MPC · JPL
410505	2008 EP_{82}	—	March 3, 2008	XuYi	PMO NEO Survey Program	ADE	2.4 km	MPC · JPL
410506	2008 EV_{82}	—	February 9, 2008	Catalina	CSS	·	2.0 km	MPC · JPL
410507	2008 EM_{88}	—	March 11, 2008	Catalina	CSS	H	520 m	MPC · JPL
410508	2008 EM_{99}	—	March 4, 2008	Catalina	CSS	EUN	1.9 km	MPC · JPL
410509	2008 EV_{110}	—	March 8, 2008	Kitt Peak	Spacewatch	(5)	1.1 km	MPC · JPL
410510	2008 EC_{115}	—	February 29, 2008	Kitt Peak	Spacewatch	HNS	1.3 km	MPC · JPL
410511	2008 EP_{116}	—	February 9, 2008	Mount Lemmon	Mount Lemmon Survey	·	1.5 km	MPC · JPL
410512	2008 EU_{118}	—	February 10, 2008	Mount Lemmon	Mount Lemmon Survey	·	1.6 km	MPC · JPL
410513	2008 EX_{125}	—	March 10, 2008	Kitt Peak	Spacewatch	·	1.0 km	MPC · JPL
410514	2008 EC_{128}	—	March 11, 2008	Kitt Peak	Spacewatch	EUN	1.7 km	MPC · JPL
410515	2008 EJ_{139}	—	March 11, 2008	Kitt Peak	Spacewatch	·	1.8 km	MPC · JPL
410516	2008 EG_{143}	—	March 13, 2008	Mount Lemmon	Mount Lemmon Survey	·	1.5 km	MPC · JPL
410517	2008 EJ_{148}	—	March 2, 2008	Kitt Peak	Spacewatch	·	1.6 km	MPC · JPL
410518	2008 EN_{152}	—	March 10, 2008	Mount Lemmon	Mount Lemmon Survey	·	2.0 km	MPC · JPL
410519	2008 EA_{153}	—	March 11, 2008	Mount Lemmon	Mount Lemmon Survey	·	1.7 km	MPC · JPL
410520	2008 EG_{156}	—	March 1, 2008	Mount Lemmon	Mount Lemmon Survey	·	3.2 km	MPC · JPL
410521	2008 EQ_{158}	—	March 10, 2008	Kitt Peak	Spacewatch	·	1.7 km	MPC · JPL
410522	2008 ET_{162}	—	March 13, 2008	Kitt Peak	Spacewatch	·	2.0 km	MPC · JPL
410523	2008 ES_{165}	—	March 4, 2008	Kitt Peak	Spacewatch	·	1.8 km	MPC · JPL
410524	2008 EC_{166}	—	March 5, 2008	Kitt Peak	Spacewatch	HNS	1.2 km	MPC · JPL
410525	2008 EU_{168}	—	March 12, 2008	Mount Lemmon	Mount Lemmon Survey	·	1.8 km	MPC · JPL
410526	2008 EW_{168}	—	March 13, 2008	Socorro	LINEAR	·	2.0 km	MPC · JPL
410527	2008 FF_{1}	—	March 25, 2008	Kitt Peak	Spacewatch	H	480 m	MPC · JPL
410528	2008 FQ_{2}	—	March 3, 2008	XuYi	PMO NEO Survey Program	MAR	1.3 km	MPC · JPL
410529	2008 FK_{4}	—	March 25, 2008	Kitt Peak	Spacewatch	·	1.7 km	MPC · JPL
410530	2008 FK_{5}	—	March 29, 2008	Catalina	CSS	H	570 m	MPC · JPL
410531	2008 FO_{7}	—	March 29, 2008	Goodricke-Pigott	R. A. Tucker	·	2.0 km	MPC · JPL
410532	2008 FE_{11}	—	March 26, 2008	Kitt Peak	Spacewatch	·	1.5 km	MPC · JPL
410533	2008 FR_{37}	—	March 28, 2008	Kitt Peak	Spacewatch	·	1.6 km	MPC · JPL
410534	2008 FN_{39}	—	March 28, 2008	Kitt Peak	Spacewatch	H	580 m	MPC · JPL
410535	2008 FW_{49}	—	March 10, 2008	Kitt Peak	Spacewatch	·	1.9 km	MPC · JPL
410536	2008 FE_{50}	—	March 12, 2008	Kitt Peak	Spacewatch	·	1.7 km	MPC · JPL
410537	2008 FV_{55}	—	February 13, 2008	Kitt Peak	Spacewatch	DOR	2.3 km	MPC · JPL
410538	2008 FS_{56}	—	March 28, 2008	Mount Lemmon	Mount Lemmon Survey	KOR	1.1 km	MPC · JPL
410539	2008 FR_{59}	—	March 29, 2008	Mount Lemmon	Mount Lemmon Survey	MAR	1.1 km	MPC · JPL
410540	2008 FK_{60}	—	March 29, 2008	Catalina	CSS	·	2.0 km	MPC · JPL
410541	2008 FW_{69}	—	March 28, 2008	Kitt Peak	Spacewatch	·	1.8 km	MPC · JPL
410542	2008 FM_{73}	—	March 5, 2008	Mount Lemmon	Mount Lemmon Survey	·	1.6 km	MPC · JPL
410543	2008 FC_{75}	—	March 31, 2008	Mount Lemmon	Mount Lemmon Survey	NEM	2.2 km	MPC · JPL
410544	2008 FC_{83}	—	March 10, 2008	Kitt Peak	Spacewatch	·	1.2 km	MPC · JPL
410545	2008 FL_{97}	—	March 13, 2008	Kitt Peak	Spacewatch	·	1.4 km	MPC · JPL
410546	2008 FB_{101}	—	March 30, 2008	Kitt Peak	Spacewatch	·	1.2 km	MPC · JPL
410547	2008 FU_{103}	—	March 30, 2008	Kitt Peak	Spacewatch	·	1.5 km	MPC · JPL
410548	2008 FO_{111}	—	March 31, 2008	Mount Lemmon	Mount Lemmon Survey	·	1.6 km	MPC · JPL
410549	2008 FE_{122}	—	March 30, 2008	Catalina	CSS	H	730 m	MPC · JPL
410550	2008 FR_{132}	—	March 28, 2008	Kitt Peak	Spacewatch	·	2.0 km	MPC · JPL
410551	2008 FA_{135}	—	March 31, 2008	Kitt Peak	Spacewatch	·	1.5 km	MPC · JPL
410552	2008 GG_{6}	—	April 1, 2008	Kitt Peak	Spacewatch	·	1.9 km	MPC · JPL
410553	2008 GX_{6}	—	April 1, 2008	Kitt Peak	Spacewatch	·	2.1 km	MPC · JPL
410554	2008 GJ_{10}	—	April 1, 2008	Kitt Peak	Spacewatch	·	1.7 km	MPC · JPL
410555	2008 GJ_{17}	—	April 4, 2008	Kitt Peak	Spacewatch	·	2.1 km	MPC · JPL
410556	2008 GA_{20}	—	April 4, 2008	Kitt Peak	Spacewatch	·	1.7 km	MPC · JPL
410557	2008 GF_{26}	—	April 1, 2008	Mount Lemmon	Mount Lemmon Survey	·	2.0 km	MPC · JPL
410558	2008 GM_{32}	—	April 3, 2008	Kitt Peak	Spacewatch	EUN	1.0 km	MPC · JPL
410559	2008 GO_{32}	—	March 30, 2008	Kitt Peak	Spacewatch	·	1.6 km	MPC · JPL
410560	2008 GL_{34}	—	March 27, 2008	Mount Lemmon	Mount Lemmon Survey	·	1.7 km	MPC · JPL
410561	2008 GD_{35}	—	April 3, 2008	Kitt Peak	Spacewatch	WIT	950 m	MPC · JPL
410562	2008 GM_{38}	—	April 3, 2008	Mount Lemmon	Mount Lemmon Survey	EOS	1.8 km	MPC · JPL
410563	2008 GO_{40}	—	March 29, 2008	Kitt Peak	Spacewatch	GEF	1.1 km	MPC · JPL
410564	2008 GS_{40}	—	April 4, 2008	Kitt Peak	Spacewatch	·	1.7 km	MPC · JPL
410565	2008 GD_{42}	—	March 29, 2008	Kitt Peak	Spacewatch	·	2.0 km	MPC · JPL
410566	2008 GT_{44}	—	April 4, 2008	Mount Lemmon	Mount Lemmon Survey	·	2.6 km	MPC · JPL
410567	2008 GF_{48}	—	April 5, 2008	Kitt Peak	Spacewatch	·	1.5 km	MPC · JPL
410568	2008 GF_{53}	—	March 10, 2008	Mount Lemmon	Mount Lemmon Survey	MRX	1.1 km	MPC · JPL
410569	2008 GP_{68}	—	March 29, 2008	Kitt Peak	Spacewatch	MRX	1.0 km	MPC · JPL
410570	2008 GS_{68}	—	April 6, 2008	Kitt Peak	Spacewatch	·	1.8 km	MPC · JPL
410571	2008 GQ_{77}	—	April 7, 2008	Kitt Peak	Spacewatch	(5)	1.3 km	MPC · JPL
410572	2008 GT_{78}	—	April 7, 2008	Kitt Peak	Spacewatch	·	1.6 km	MPC · JPL
410573	2008 GT_{82}	—	January 19, 2008	Mount Lemmon	Mount Lemmon Survey	·	2.4 km	MPC · JPL
410574	2008 GR_{89}	—	October 25, 2005	Mount Lemmon	Mount Lemmon Survey	·	1.9 km	MPC · JPL
410575	2008 GE_{90}	—	March 4, 2008	Mount Lemmon	Mount Lemmon Survey	·	2.0 km	MPC · JPL
410576	2008 GS_{90}	—	March 29, 2008	Mount Lemmon	Mount Lemmon Survey	EUN	1.1 km	MPC · JPL
410577	2008 GL_{99}	—	April 9, 2008	Kitt Peak	Spacewatch	·	1.9 km	MPC · JPL
410578	2008 GF_{102}	—	April 10, 2008	Kitt Peak	Spacewatch	·	2.2 km	MPC · JPL
410579	2008 GT_{103}	—	March 28, 2008	Kitt Peak	Spacewatch	·	1.2 km	MPC · JPL
410580	2008 GV_{103}	—	April 11, 2008	Kitt Peak	Spacewatch	·	1.5 km	MPC · JPL
410581	2008 GG_{110}	—	March 10, 2008	Kitt Peak	Spacewatch	H	390 m	MPC · JPL
410582	2008 GN_{113}	—	April 9, 2008	Kitt Peak	Spacewatch	H	590 m	MPC · JPL
410583	2008 GJ_{114}	—	March 10, 2008	Mount Lemmon	Mount Lemmon Survey	MAR	980 m	MPC · JPL
410584	2008 GZ_{121}	—	April 13, 2008	Kitt Peak	Spacewatch	·	1.6 km	MPC · JPL
410585	2008 GU_{123}	—	February 2, 2008	Mount Lemmon	Mount Lemmon Survey	·	1.8 km	MPC · JPL
410586	2008 GN_{128}	—	March 30, 2008	Catalina	CSS	·	2.5 km	MPC · JPL
410587	2008 GS_{129}	—	April 4, 2008	Kitt Peak	Spacewatch	·	2.0 km	MPC · JPL
410588	2008 GR_{132}	—	April 14, 2008	Kitt Peak	Spacewatch	·	2.0 km	MPC · JPL
410589	2008 GZ_{136}	—	April 8, 2008	Kitt Peak	Spacewatch	WIT	990 m	MPC · JPL
410590	2008 GB_{140}	—	April 6, 2008	Kitt Peak	Spacewatch	·	2.4 km	MPC · JPL
410591	2008 GF_{142}	—	April 5, 2008	Catalina	CSS	H	620 m	MPC · JPL
410592	2008 GU_{145}	—	April 11, 2008	Socorro	LINEAR	GAL	2.2 km	MPC · JPL
410593	2008 GL_{146}	—	April 15, 2008	Mount Lemmon	Mount Lemmon Survey	·	2.2 km	MPC · JPL
410594	2008 HZ_{2}	—	March 2, 2008	Mount Lemmon	Mount Lemmon Survey	·	2.6 km	MPC · JPL
410595	2008 HG_{4}	—	March 4, 2008	Mount Lemmon	Mount Lemmon Survey	·	2.1 km	MPC · JPL
410596	2008 HJ_{25}	—	April 27, 2008	Mount Lemmon	Mount Lemmon Survey	WIT	880 m	MPC · JPL
410597	2008 HW_{25}	—	April 4, 2008	Kitt Peak	Spacewatch	·	2.4 km	MPC · JPL
410598	2008 HN_{27}	—	April 27, 2008	Kitt Peak	Spacewatch	·	1.8 km	MPC · JPL
410599	2008 HL_{32}	—	March 29, 2008	Kitt Peak	Spacewatch	·	1.8 km	MPC · JPL
410600	2008 HG_{35}	—	April 28, 2008	Kitt Peak	Spacewatch	H	520 m	MPC · JPL

== 410601–410700 ==
back to top

Designation			Discovery			Properties		Ref
Permanent	Provisional	Named after	Date	Site	Discoverer(s)	Category	Diam.	Ref
410601	2008 HC_{54}	—	April 29, 2008	Kitt Peak	Spacewatch	AGN	1.2 km	MPC · JPL
410602	2008 HS_{59}	—	April 30, 2008	Kitt Peak	Spacewatch	·	1.8 km	MPC · JPL
410603	2008 HY_{66}	—	April 28, 2008	Kitt Peak	Spacewatch	·	2.0 km	MPC · JPL
410604	2008 JU_{17}	—	May 4, 2008	Kitt Peak	Spacewatch	·	1.8 km	MPC · JPL
410605	2008 JF_{24}	—	May 8, 2008	Mount Lemmon	Mount Lemmon Survey	HNS	1.5 km	MPC · JPL
410606	2008 JK_{31}	—	March 29, 2008	Kitt Peak	Spacewatch	EUN	1.1 km	MPC · JPL
410607	2008 JZ_{37}	—	May 1, 2008	Kitt Peak	Spacewatch	·	1.9 km	MPC · JPL
410608	2008 KH_{25}	—	May 14, 2008	Mount Lemmon	Mount Lemmon Survey	·	1.7 km	MPC · JPL
410609	2008 LG	—	June 1, 2008	Kitt Peak	Spacewatch	·	2.3 km	MPC · JPL
410610	2008 LK_{13}	—	June 7, 2008	Kitt Peak	Spacewatch	·	1.6 km	MPC · JPL
410611	2008 MM	—	June 24, 2008	Siding Spring	SSS	·	5.0 km	MPC · JPL
410612	2008 MV_{4}	—	June 29, 2008	Bergisch Gladbach	W. Bickel	·	2.7 km	MPC · JPL
410613	2008 NJ_{2}	—	July 1, 2008	Charleston	Astronomical Research Observatory	·	3.1 km	MPC · JPL
410614	2008 OL_{11}	—	July 31, 2008	La Sagra	OAM	·	2.3 km	MPC · JPL
410615	2008 OT_{13}	—	July 29, 2008	La Sagra	OAM	·	2.8 km	MPC · JPL
410616	2008 OG_{23}	—	July 30, 2008	Mount Lemmon	Mount Lemmon Survey	·	2.5 km	MPC · JPL
410617	2008 PN_{3}	—	August 4, 2008	Skylive	Tozzi, F.	·	4.6 km	MPC · JPL
410618	2008 PP_{5}	—	August 1, 2008	La Sagra	OAM	·	3.8 km	MPC · JPL
410619 Fabry	2008 PL_{6}	Fabry	August 2, 2008	Eygalayes	Sogorb, P.	TIR	3.2 km	MPC · JPL
410620	2008 PG_{11}	—	August 7, 2008	Reedy Creek	J. Broughton	·	3.4 km	MPC · JPL
410621	2008 PV_{21}	—	August 2, 2008	La Sagra	OAM	·	3.6 km	MPC · JPL
410622	2008 QF	—	August 21, 2008	Kitt Peak	Spacewatch	AMO	160 m	MPC · JPL
410623	2008 QX_{23}	—	August 21, 2008	Kitt Peak	Spacewatch	TIR	2.6 km	MPC · JPL
410624	2008 QF_{34}	—	August 29, 2008	La Sagra	OAM	·	3.4 km	MPC · JPL
410625	2008 QK_{36}	—	August 20, 2008	Kitt Peak	Spacewatch	·	2.6 km	MPC · JPL
410626	2008 QV_{47}	—	August 23, 2008	Kitt Peak	Spacewatch	·	2.8 km	MPC · JPL
410627	2008 RG_{1}	—	September 4, 2008	Socorro	LINEAR	APO · PHA	230 m	MPC · JPL
410628	2008 RS_{3}	—	September 2, 2008	Kitt Peak	Spacewatch	·	3.8 km	MPC · JPL
410629	2008 RQ_{12}	—	September 3, 2008	Kitt Peak	Spacewatch	HYG	3.1 km	MPC · JPL
410630	2008 RD_{19}	—	September 4, 2008	Kitt Peak	Spacewatch	·	4.1 km	MPC · JPL
410631	2008 RA_{20}	—	August 24, 2008	Kitt Peak	Spacewatch	·	2.4 km	MPC · JPL
410632	2008 RA_{30}	—	September 2, 2008	Kitt Peak	Spacewatch	THM	2.2 km	MPC · JPL
410633	2008 RR_{33}	—	September 2, 2008	Kitt Peak	Spacewatch	HOF	4.0 km	MPC · JPL
410634	2008 RN_{37}	—	September 2, 2008	Kitt Peak	Spacewatch	·	2.3 km	MPC · JPL
410635	2008 RP_{46}	—	September 2, 2008	Kitt Peak	Spacewatch	TIR	3.1 km	MPC · JPL
410636	2008 RY_{51}	—	September 3, 2008	Kitt Peak	Spacewatch	·	2.8 km	MPC · JPL
410637	2008 RU_{67}	—	September 4, 2008	Kitt Peak	Spacewatch	THB	3.9 km	MPC · JPL
410638	2008 RQ_{71}	—	September 6, 2008	Mount Lemmon	Mount Lemmon Survey	VER	2.3 km	MPC · JPL
410639	2008 RZ_{74}	—	September 6, 2008	Mount Lemmon	Mount Lemmon Survey	URS	3.3 km	MPC · JPL
410640	2008 RC_{87}	—	September 5, 2008	Kitt Peak	Spacewatch	CYB	4.4 km	MPC · JPL
410641	2008 RX_{91}	—	September 6, 2008	Kitt Peak	Spacewatch	URS	2.9 km	MPC · JPL
410642	2008 RR_{106}	—	September 7, 2008	Catalina	CSS	·	2.9 km	MPC · JPL
410643	2008 RN_{111}	—	September 4, 2008	Kitt Peak	Spacewatch	VER	2.9 km	MPC · JPL
410644	2008 RK_{119}	—	September 4, 2008	Kitt Peak	Spacewatch	EOS	1.7 km	MPC · JPL
410645	2008 RW_{131}	—	September 7, 2008	Mount Lemmon	Mount Lemmon Survey	·	3.8 km	MPC · JPL
410646	2008 RG_{137}	—	September 5, 2008	Kitt Peak	Spacewatch	HYG	3.4 km	MPC · JPL
410647	2008 RE_{138}	—	September 6, 2008	Catalina	CSS	·	4.0 km	MPC · JPL
410648	2008 RA_{145}	—	September 5, 2008	Kitt Peak	Spacewatch	·	3.1 km	MPC · JPL
410649	2008 SO	—	September 21, 2008	Kitt Peak	Spacewatch	AMO	240 m	MPC · JPL
410650	2008 SQ_{1}	—	September 23, 2008	Catalina	CSS	T_{j} (2.98) · AMO	700 m	MPC · JPL
410651	2008 SX_{19}	—	September 22, 2003	Kitt Peak	Spacewatch	·	2.6 km	MPC · JPL
410652	2008 SG_{27}	—	September 19, 2008	Kitt Peak	Spacewatch	·	3.3 km	MPC · JPL
410653	2008 ST_{31}	—	September 20, 2008	Catalina	CSS	·	2.9 km	MPC · JPL
410654	2008 SW_{44}	—	September 20, 2008	Kitt Peak	Spacewatch	·	4.4 km	MPC · JPL
410655	2008 SC_{57}	—	September 20, 2008	Kitt Peak	Spacewatch	LUT	5.3 km	MPC · JPL
410656	2008 SW_{66}	—	September 21, 2008	Catalina	CSS	CYB	5.2 km	MPC · JPL
410657	2008 SF_{83}	—	September 27, 2008	Modra	Gajdoš, Š.	HYG	3.1 km	MPC · JPL
410658	2008 SH_{137}	—	September 23, 2008	Mount Lemmon	Mount Lemmon Survey	·	3.7 km	MPC · JPL
410659	2008 SJ_{150}	—	September 28, 2008	Bastia	Bastia	·	2.6 km	MPC · JPL
410660	2008 ST_{150}	—	September 30, 2008	Mount Lemmon	Mount Lemmon Survey	T_{j} (2.94)	3.5 km	MPC · JPL
410661	2008 SE_{151}	—	September 28, 2008	Catalina	CSS	T_{j} (2.92)	3.7 km	MPC · JPL
410662	2008 SD_{152}	—	September 29, 2008	Hibiscus	Teamo, N.	·	2.9 km	MPC · JPL
410663	2008 SC_{157}	—	September 24, 2008	Socorro	LINEAR	·	2.9 km	MPC · JPL
410664	2008 SJ_{158}	—	September 24, 2008	Socorro	LINEAR	·	3.0 km	MPC · JPL
410665	2008 SG_{161}	—	September 19, 2008	Kitt Peak	Spacewatch	·	4.6 km	MPC · JPL
410666	2008 SY_{173}	—	September 22, 2008	Catalina	CSS	H	650 m	MPC · JPL
410667	2008 SG_{193}	—	September 25, 2008	Kitt Peak	Spacewatch	·	3.8 km	MPC · JPL
410668	2008 SC_{202}	—	September 26, 2008	Kitt Peak	Spacewatch	CYB	3.3 km	MPC · JPL
410669	2008 ST_{219}	—	September 30, 2008	La Sagra	OAM	·	3.0 km	MPC · JPL
410670	2008 SF_{267}	—	September 22, 2008	Catalina	CSS	·	3.7 km	MPC · JPL
410671	2008 SU_{301}	—	September 23, 2008	Mount Lemmon	Mount Lemmon Survey	·	3.1 km	MPC · JPL
410672	2008 TC_{97}	—	October 6, 2008	Kitt Peak	Spacewatch	·	3.6 km	MPC · JPL
410673	2008 UT_{23}	—	October 20, 2008	Kitt Peak	Spacewatch	·	3.4 km	MPC · JPL
410674	2008 UY_{55}	—	October 10, 2008	Mount Lemmon	Mount Lemmon Survey	CYB	3.4 km	MPC · JPL
410675	2008 UZ_{66}	—	October 21, 2008	Kitt Peak	Spacewatch	SYL · CYB	6.3 km	MPC · JPL
410676	2008 UA_{75}	—	October 21, 2008	Kitt Peak	Spacewatch	·	860 m	MPC · JPL
410677	2008 UM_{169}	—	October 24, 2008	Kitt Peak	Spacewatch	·	4.9 km	MPC · JPL
410678	2008 UC_{205}	—	October 24, 2008	Siding Spring	SSS	·	7.1 km	MPC · JPL
410679	2008 US_{288}	—	October 28, 2008	Mount Lemmon	Mount Lemmon Survey	·	700 m	MPC · JPL
410680	2008 UW_{360}	—	October 24, 2008	Catalina	CSS	·	5.1 km	MPC · JPL
410681	2008 UX_{366}	—	October 24, 2008	Socorro	LINEAR	·	4.3 km	MPC · JPL
410682	2008 VJ_{21}	—	November 1, 2008	Mount Lemmon	Mount Lemmon Survey	·	620 m	MPC · JPL
410683	2008 VA_{56}	—	November 6, 2008	Mount Lemmon	Mount Lemmon Survey	SYL · CYB	4.5 km	MPC · JPL
410684	2008 WR_{45}	—	November 5, 2008	Kitt Peak	Spacewatch	·	610 m	MPC · JPL
410685	2008 WA_{59}	—	November 22, 2008	Sandlot	G. Hug	·	590 m	MPC · JPL
410686	2008 WU_{81}	—	November 20, 2008	Kitt Peak	Spacewatch	·	470 m	MPC · JPL
410687	2008 WR_{128}	—	November 21, 2008	Kitt Peak	Spacewatch	·	660 m	MPC · JPL
410688	2008 WF_{141}	—	November 21, 2008	Kitt Peak	Spacewatch	·	940 m	MPC · JPL
410689	2008 XK_{18}	—	December 1, 2008	Kitt Peak	Spacewatch	·	810 m	MPC · JPL
410690	2008 XT_{32}	—	October 23, 2008	Kitt Peak	Spacewatch	·	690 m	MPC · JPL
410691	2008 XP_{41}	—	December 2, 2008	Kitt Peak	Spacewatch	·	750 m	MPC · JPL
410692	2008 XM_{48}	—	December 4, 2008	Mount Lemmon	Mount Lemmon Survey	·	1.5 km	MPC · JPL
410693	2008 XO_{49}	—	December 7, 2008	Mount Lemmon	Mount Lemmon Survey	·	1.6 km	MPC · JPL
410694	2008 YE_{17}	—	December 21, 2008	Mount Lemmon	Mount Lemmon Survey	·	810 m	MPC · JPL
410695	2008 YV_{18}	—	December 21, 2008	Mount Lemmon	Mount Lemmon Survey	·	900 m	MPC · JPL
410696	2008 YA_{80}	—	November 24, 2008	Mount Lemmon	Mount Lemmon Survey	·	790 m	MPC · JPL
410697	2008 YZ_{84}	—	November 8, 2008	Mount Lemmon	Mount Lemmon Survey	V	770 m	MPC · JPL
410698	2008 YO_{103}	—	December 29, 2008	Kitt Peak	Spacewatch	·	650 m	MPC · JPL
410699	2008 YB_{128}	—	December 30, 2008	Kitt Peak	Spacewatch	·	600 m	MPC · JPL
410700	2008 YJ_{157}	—	December 30, 2008	Kitt Peak	Spacewatch	·	1.1 km	MPC · JPL

== 410701–410800 ==
back to top

Designation			Discovery			Properties		Ref
Permanent	Provisional	Named after	Date	Site	Discoverer(s)	Category	Diam.	Ref
410701	2008 YQ_{159}	—	December 21, 2008	Kitt Peak	Spacewatch	·	760 m	MPC · JPL
410702	2008 YH_{162}	—	November 20, 2008	Mount Lemmon	Mount Lemmon Survey	·	610 m	MPC · JPL
410703	2009 AN_{12}	—	January 2, 2009	Mount Lemmon	Mount Lemmon Survey	·	920 m	MPC · JPL
410704	2009 AJ_{28}	—	December 22, 2008	Mount Lemmon	Mount Lemmon Survey	·	710 m	MPC · JPL
410705	2009 AE_{33}	—	January 15, 2009	Kitt Peak	Spacewatch	·	1.2 km	MPC · JPL
410706	2009 AD_{34}	—	January 15, 2009	Kitt Peak	Spacewatch	·	660 m	MPC · JPL
410707	2009 AM_{40}	—	January 7, 2009	Kitt Peak	Spacewatch	·	730 m	MPC · JPL
410708	2009 AA_{44}	—	January 3, 2009	Mount Lemmon	Mount Lemmon Survey	·	630 m	MPC · JPL
410709	2009 BQ_{10}	—	January 21, 2009	Sierra Stars	Tozzi, F.	·	2.4 km	MPC · JPL
410710	2009 BQ_{24}	—	January 17, 2009	Catalina	CSS	·	670 m	MPC · JPL
410711	2009 BR_{26}	—	January 16, 2009	Kitt Peak	Spacewatch	·	670 m	MPC · JPL
410712	2009 BO_{30}	—	December 30, 2008	Kitt Peak	Spacewatch	V	720 m	MPC · JPL
410713	2009 BC_{39}	—	January 16, 2009	Kitt Peak	Spacewatch	NYS	880 m	MPC · JPL
410714	2009 BV_{41}	—	January 16, 2009	Kitt Peak	Spacewatch	·	1.0 km	MPC · JPL
410715	2009 BQ_{44}	—	January 16, 2009	Kitt Peak	Spacewatch	·	800 m	MPC · JPL
410716	2009 BO_{56}	—	December 4, 2008	Mount Lemmon	Mount Lemmon Survey	·	570 m	MPC · JPL
410717	2009 BV_{57}	—	January 20, 2009	Kitt Peak	Spacewatch	·	930 m	MPC · JPL
410718	2009 BN_{66}	—	January 20, 2009	Kitt Peak	Spacewatch	V	680 m	MPC · JPL
410719	2009 BJ_{67}	—	January 20, 2009	Kitt Peak	Spacewatch	NYS	1.1 km	MPC · JPL
410720	2009 BC_{70}	—	November 21, 2008	Mount Lemmon	Mount Lemmon Survey	·	2.0 km	MPC · JPL
410721	2009 BR_{79}	—	December 31, 2008	Kitt Peak	Spacewatch	·	960 m	MPC · JPL
410722	2009 BO_{80}	—	January 31, 2009	Socorro	LINEAR	·	860 m	MPC · JPL
410723	2009 BU_{94}	—	December 22, 2008	Mount Lemmon	Mount Lemmon Survey	·	660 m	MPC · JPL
410724	2009 BW_{100}	—	March 25, 2006	Kitt Peak	Spacewatch	·	680 m	MPC · JPL
410725	2009 BV_{106}	—	January 3, 2009	Mount Lemmon	Mount Lemmon Survey	·	720 m	MPC · JPL
410726	2009 BO_{108}	—	January 29, 2009	Mount Lemmon	Mount Lemmon Survey	·	850 m	MPC · JPL
410727	2009 BT_{109}	—	January 20, 2009	Mount Lemmon	Mount Lemmon Survey	·	620 m	MPC · JPL
410728	2009 BO_{184}	—	January 18, 2009	Catalina	CSS	·	720 m	MPC · JPL
410729	2009 BQ_{184}	—	January 18, 2009	Socorro	LINEAR	·	1.0 km	MPC · JPL
410730	2009 BP_{186}	—	January 18, 2009	Kitt Peak	Spacewatch	·	1.4 km	MPC · JPL
410731	2009 CO_{24}	—	February 1, 2009	Kitt Peak	Spacewatch	V	620 m	MPC · JPL
410732	2009 CF_{25}	—	January 19, 2009	Mount Lemmon	Mount Lemmon Survey	·	1.1 km	MPC · JPL
410733	2009 CY_{26}	—	February 1, 2009	Kitt Peak	Spacewatch	·	970 m	MPC · JPL
410734	2009 CQ_{27}	—	February 1, 2009	Kitt Peak	Spacewatch	·	1.1 km	MPC · JPL
410735	2009 CR_{29}	—	February 1, 2009	Kitt Peak	Spacewatch	·	620 m	MPC · JPL
410736	2009 CX_{31}	—	February 1, 2009	Kitt Peak	Spacewatch	·	830 m	MPC · JPL
410737	2009 CZ_{32}	—	September 28, 2003	Kitt Peak	Spacewatch	·	1.2 km	MPC · JPL
410738	2009 CM_{40}	—	February 13, 2009	Kitt Peak	Spacewatch	·	850 m	MPC · JPL
410739	2009 CN_{49}	—	February 14, 2009	Mount Lemmon	Mount Lemmon Survey	·	990 m	MPC · JPL
410740	2009 CM_{52}	—	February 14, 2009	Mount Lemmon	Mount Lemmon Survey	NYS	590 m	MPC · JPL
410741	2009 CQ_{53}	—	January 23, 2009	XuYi	PMO NEO Survey Program	·	810 m	MPC · JPL
410742	2009 CJ_{55}	—	February 14, 2009	Mount Lemmon	Mount Lemmon Survey	·	640 m	MPC · JPL
410743	2009 CX_{55}	—	February 1, 2009	Mount Lemmon	Mount Lemmon Survey	·	2.1 km	MPC · JPL
410744	2009 CR_{63}	—	February 4, 2009	Mount Lemmon	Mount Lemmon Survey	NYS	1.2 km	MPC · JPL
410745	2009 DA_{9}	—	February 19, 2009	Mount Lemmon	Mount Lemmon Survey	·	1.3 km	MPC · JPL
410746	2009 DM_{17}	—	February 17, 2009	Kitt Peak	Spacewatch	·	1.1 km	MPC · JPL
410747	2009 DU_{20}	—	October 13, 2001	Kitt Peak	Spacewatch	·	520 m	MPC · JPL
410748	2009 DP_{22}	—	February 19, 2009	Kitt Peak	Spacewatch	V	610 m	MPC · JPL
410749	2009 DX_{23}	—	February 20, 2009	Catalina	CSS	PHO	1.2 km	MPC · JPL
410750	2009 DO_{36}	—	February 3, 2009	Mount Lemmon	Mount Lemmon Survey	·	540 m	MPC · JPL
410751	2009 DK_{47}	—	February 26, 2009	Calvin-Rehoboth	Calvin College	·	1.2 km	MPC · JPL
410752	2009 DQ_{47}	—	February 1, 2009	Kitt Peak	Spacewatch	·	900 m	MPC · JPL
410753	2009 DH_{52}	—	January 20, 2009	Kitt Peak	Spacewatch	·	620 m	MPC · JPL
410754	2009 DM_{55}	—	February 22, 2009	Kitt Peak	Spacewatch	·	870 m	MPC · JPL
410755	2009 DZ_{57}	—	February 22, 2009	Kitt Peak	Spacewatch	·	1.2 km	MPC · JPL
410756	2009 DW_{61}	—	February 22, 2009	Kitt Peak	Spacewatch	·	1.2 km	MPC · JPL
410757	2009 DV_{71}	—	February 20, 2009	Kitt Peak	Spacewatch	·	1.2 km	MPC · JPL
410758	2009 DM_{72}	—	February 22, 2009	Kitt Peak	Spacewatch	·	720 m	MPC · JPL
410759	2009 DC_{77}	—	December 22, 2008	Mount Lemmon	Mount Lemmon Survey	·	810 m	MPC · JPL
410760	2009 DP_{80}	—	January 1, 2009	Mount Lemmon	Mount Lemmon Survey	·	1.3 km	MPC · JPL
410761	2009 DV_{96}	—	February 24, 2009	Kitt Peak	Spacewatch	·	1.6 km	MPC · JPL
410762	2009 DC_{105}	—	February 26, 2009	Kitt Peak	Spacewatch	·	1.1 km	MPC · JPL
410763	2009 DK_{118}	—	February 27, 2009	Kitt Peak	Spacewatch	·	960 m	MPC · JPL
410764	2009 DC_{120}	—	February 19, 2009	Kitt Peak	Spacewatch	·	930 m	MPC · JPL
410765	2009 DH_{122}	—	February 19, 2009	Kitt Peak	Spacewatch	MAS	900 m	MPC · JPL
410766	2009 DR_{130}	—	February 27, 2009	Kitt Peak	Spacewatch	·	880 m	MPC · JPL
410767	2009 DL_{137}	—	February 28, 2009	Kitt Peak	Spacewatch	·	1.2 km	MPC · JPL
410768	2009 DL_{139}	—	February 27, 2009	Mount Lemmon	Mount Lemmon Survey	(5)	1.2 km	MPC · JPL
410769	2009 EG	—	March 1, 2009	Tzec Maun	Tozzi, F.	PHO	2.1 km	MPC · JPL
410770	2009 ER_{1}	—	March 2, 2009	Calvin-Rehoboth	Calvin College	·	1.3 km	MPC · JPL
410771	2009 EL_{2}	—	March 1, 2009	Great Shefford	Birtwhistle, P.	·	1.2 km	MPC · JPL
410772	2009 ER_{5}	—	March 1, 2009	Kitt Peak	Spacewatch	·	1.7 km	MPC · JPL
410773	2009 EH_{10}	—	March 1, 2009	Kitt Peak	Spacewatch	MAS	590 m	MPC · JPL
410774	2009 EK_{17}	—	January 31, 2009	Kitt Peak	Spacewatch	MAS	730 m	MPC · JPL
410775	2009 EG_{19}	—	February 5, 2009	Kitt Peak	Spacewatch	·	760 m	MPC · JPL
410776	2009 EP_{21}	—	March 15, 2009	Kitt Peak	Spacewatch	·	1.1 km	MPC · JPL
410777	2009 FD	—	February 24, 2009	Kitt Peak	Spacewatch	APO · moon	470 m	MPC · JPL
410778	2009 FG_{19}	—	March 21, 2009	Mount Lemmon	Mount Lemmon Survey	T_{j} (2.39) · APO +1km · PHA	1.5 km	MPC · JPL
410779	2009 FD_{23}	—	March 20, 2009	Bergisch Gladbach	W. Bickel	·	2.2 km	MPC · JPL
410780	2009 FT_{26}	—	March 17, 2009	Catalina	CSS	PHO	1.1 km	MPC · JPL
410781	2009 FY_{30}	—	January 31, 2009	Mount Lemmon	Mount Lemmon Survey	NYS	1.4 km	MPC · JPL
410782	2009 FS_{31}	—	March 20, 2009	La Sagra	OAM	·	1.1 km	MPC · JPL
410783	2009 FL_{44}	—	February 20, 2009	Kitt Peak	Spacewatch	V	740 m	MPC · JPL
410784	2009 FW_{47}	—	March 16, 2009	Kitt Peak	Spacewatch	·	1.2 km	MPC · JPL
410785	2009 FV_{54}	—	October 30, 2008	Mount Lemmon	Mount Lemmon Survey	·	820 m	MPC · JPL
410786	2009 FM_{67}	—	March 19, 2009	Mount Lemmon	Mount Lemmon Survey	·	1.2 km	MPC · JPL
410787	2009 FP_{68}	—	March 21, 2009	Catalina	CSS	·	1.9 km	MPC · JPL
410788	2009 FT_{73}	—	March 27, 2009	Siding Spring	SSS	·	1.7 km	MPC · JPL
410789	2009 HT_{22}	—	March 2, 2009	Mount Lemmon	Mount Lemmon Survey	·	1.7 km	MPC · JPL
410790	2009 HE_{23}	—	February 2, 2005	Kitt Peak	Spacewatch	V	720 m	MPC · JPL
410791	2009 HK_{24}	—	April 17, 2009	Kitt Peak	Spacewatch	·	1.2 km	MPC · JPL
410792	2009 HM_{30}	—	March 18, 2009	Kitt Peak	Spacewatch	NYS	790 m	MPC · JPL
410793	2009 HS_{31}	—	April 19, 2009	Kitt Peak	Spacewatch	·	1.6 km	MPC · JPL
410794	2009 HY_{31}	—	April 19, 2009	Kitt Peak	Spacewatch	·	1.9 km	MPC · JPL
410795	2009 HK_{32}	—	April 19, 2009	Kitt Peak	Spacewatch	·	1.7 km	MPC · JPL
410796	2009 HN_{35}	—	March 21, 2009	Kitt Peak	Spacewatch	·	1.6 km	MPC · JPL
410797	2009 HH_{44}	—	March 2, 2009	Mount Lemmon	Mount Lemmon Survey	·	1.4 km	MPC · JPL
410798	2009 HW_{64}	—	March 16, 2009	Kitt Peak	Spacewatch	·	730 m	MPC · JPL
410799	2009 HT_{74}	—	April 26, 2009	Kitt Peak	Spacewatch	·	1.4 km	MPC · JPL
410800	2009 HH_{79}	—	April 26, 2009	Kitt Peak	Spacewatch	MAS	770 m	MPC · JPL

== 410801–410900 ==
back to top

Designation			Discovery			Properties		Ref
Permanent	Provisional	Named after	Date	Site	Discoverer(s)	Category	Diam.	Ref
410801	2009 HT_{94}	—	April 28, 2009	Cerro Burek	Burek, Cerro	·	890 m	MPC · JPL
410802	2009 HV_{106}	—	April 21, 2009	Mount Lemmon	Mount Lemmon Survey	·	1.4 km	MPC · JPL
410803	2009 JP_{3}	—	March 31, 2009	Mount Lemmon	Mount Lemmon Survey	·	1.6 km	MPC · JPL
410804	2009 JZ_{4}	—	May 3, 2009	Mount Lemmon	Mount Lemmon Survey	PHO	1.1 km	MPC · JPL
410805	2009 KW_{1}	—	April 17, 2009	Kitt Peak	Spacewatch	·	1.6 km	MPC · JPL
410806	2009 KX_{1}	—	April 30, 2009	Kitt Peak	Spacewatch	·	1.3 km	MPC · JPL
410807	2009 KU_{4}	—	May 17, 2009	La Sagra	OAM	·	2.9 km	MPC · JPL
410808	2009 KA_{7}	—	February 13, 2009	Mount Lemmon	Mount Lemmon Survey	·	1.8 km	MPC · JPL
410809	2009 KC_{14}	—	April 17, 2009	Mount Lemmon	Mount Lemmon Survey	·	2.3 km	MPC · JPL
410810	2009 KF_{16}	—	May 26, 2009	Kitt Peak	Spacewatch	·	1.1 km	MPC · JPL
410811	2009 KQ_{22}	—	January 31, 2009	Kitt Peak	Spacewatch	·	1.1 km	MPC · JPL
410812	2009 KW_{22}	—	May 1, 2009	Mount Lemmon	Mount Lemmon Survey	·	1.7 km	MPC · JPL
410813	2009 KN_{23}	—	May 27, 2009	Kitt Peak	Spacewatch	·	1.6 km	MPC · JPL
410814	2009 KY_{23}	—	April 19, 2009	Kitt Peak	Spacewatch	·	1.7 km	MPC · JPL
410815	2009 KS_{28}	—	May 1, 2009	Mount Lemmon	Mount Lemmon Survey	BRG	1.6 km	MPC · JPL
410816	2009 LT_{5}	—	April 21, 2009	Mount Lemmon	Mount Lemmon Survey	·	2.4 km	MPC · JPL
410817 Zaffino	2009 MN	Zaffino	June 19, 2009	Wrightwood	J. W. Young	·	2.9 km	MPC · JPL
410818	2009 MZ_{9}	—	June 23, 2009	Mount Lemmon	Mount Lemmon Survey	·	2.3 km	MPC · JPL
410819	2009 NF_{2}	—	July 14, 2009	Kitt Peak	Spacewatch	·	2.0 km	MPC · JPL
410820	2009 OH_{5}	—	July 25, 2009	La Sagra	OAM	·	2.7 km	MPC · JPL
410821	2009 OL_{6}	—	July 26, 2009	La Sagra	OAM	·	2.7 km	MPC · JPL
410822	2009 OH_{11}	—	July 27, 2009	Kitt Peak	Spacewatch	·	2.1 km	MPC · JPL
410823	2009 OC_{13}	—	July 27, 2009	Kitt Peak	Spacewatch	·	2.4 km	MPC · JPL
410824	2009 OJ_{20}	—	July 29, 2009	La Sagra	OAM	HNS	1.7 km	MPC · JPL
410825	2009 OL_{20}	—	July 29, 2009	La Sagra	OAM	·	2.8 km	MPC · JPL
410826	2009 PE_{4}	—	August 14, 2009	La Sagra	OAM	·	1.7 km	MPC · JPL
410827	2009 PK_{7}	—	August 15, 2009	Kitt Peak	Spacewatch	VER	2.7 km	MPC · JPL
410828	2009 PK_{11}	—	August 15, 2009	Kitt Peak	Spacewatch	(13314)	1.8 km	MPC · JPL
410829	2009 PM_{14}	—	August 15, 2009	Catalina	CSS	·	2.3 km	MPC · JPL
410830	2009 PT_{18}	—	August 1, 2009	Siding Spring	SSS	·	2.6 km	MPC · JPL
410831	2009 QF_{4}	—	August 17, 2009	Catalina	CSS	·	2.3 km	MPC · JPL
410832	2009 QO_{8}	—	August 18, 2009	Siding Spring	SSS	AMO	490 m	MPC · JPL
410833	2009 QL_{9}	—	August 17, 2009	Hibiscus	Teamo, N.	·	2.0 km	MPC · JPL
410834	2009 QB_{23}	—	August 21, 2009	La Sagra	OAM	H	470 m	MPC · JPL
410835 Neszmerak	2009 QF_{26}	Neszmerak	August 20, 2009	Gaisberg	Gierlinger, R.	·	1.8 km	MPC · JPL
410836	2009 QN_{28}	—	July 14, 2009	Kitt Peak	Spacewatch	·	1.6 km	MPC · JPL
410837	2009 QS_{31}	—	June 23, 2009	Mount Lemmon	Mount Lemmon Survey	·	1.7 km	MPC · JPL
410838	2009 QW_{31}	—	September 24, 2000	Socorro	LINEAR	·	2.5 km	MPC · JPL
410839	2009 QM_{53}	—	August 16, 2009	Kitt Peak	Spacewatch	·	2.0 km	MPC · JPL
410840	2009 QA_{56}	—	August 31, 2009	Siding Spring	SSS	·	2.2 km	MPC · JPL
410841	2009 QK_{56}	—	August 16, 2009	Kitt Peak	Spacewatch	·	1.7 km	MPC · JPL
410842	2009 QK_{64}	—	August 27, 2009	Kitt Peak	Spacewatch	·	3.1 km	MPC · JPL
410843	2009 RX_{7}	—	September 12, 2009	Kitt Peak	Spacewatch	·	2.1 km	MPC · JPL
410844	2009 RL_{8}	—	September 12, 2009	Kitt Peak	Spacewatch	·	3.5 km	MPC · JPL
410845	2009 RH_{10}	—	September 12, 2009	Kitt Peak	Spacewatch	·	2.3 km	MPC · JPL
410846	2009 RP_{10}	—	September 12, 2009	Kitt Peak	Spacewatch	·	1.7 km	MPC · JPL
410847	2009 RG_{17}	—	September 12, 2009	Kitt Peak	Spacewatch	·	2.2 km	MPC · JPL
410848	2009 RJ_{18}	—	September 12, 2009	Kitt Peak	Spacewatch	KOR	1.5 km	MPC · JPL
410849	2009 RA_{30}	—	September 14, 2009	Kitt Peak	Spacewatch	EOS	2.0 km	MPC · JPL
410850	2009 RZ_{33}	—	September 14, 2009	Kitt Peak	Spacewatch	·	2.2 km	MPC · JPL
410851	2009 RE_{34}	—	September 14, 2009	Kitt Peak	Spacewatch	EOS	1.9 km	MPC · JPL
410852	2009 RL_{34}	—	September 14, 2009	Kitt Peak	Spacewatch	·	1.4 km	MPC · JPL
410853	2009 RE_{37}	—	August 17, 2009	Catalina	CSS	·	2.5 km	MPC · JPL
410854	2009 RJ_{38}	—	September 15, 2009	Kitt Peak	Spacewatch	·	2.2 km	MPC · JPL
410855	2009 RZ_{39}	—	September 15, 2009	Kitt Peak	Spacewatch	·	2.1 km	MPC · JPL
410856	2009 RP_{42}	—	September 15, 2009	Kitt Peak	Spacewatch	EOS	2.0 km	MPC · JPL
410857	2009 RV_{45}	—	September 15, 2009	Kitt Peak	Spacewatch	·	3.6 km	MPC · JPL
410858	2009 RU_{46}	—	September 15, 2009	Kitt Peak	Spacewatch	·	2.5 km	MPC · JPL
410859	2009 RJ_{50}	—	September 15, 2009	Kitt Peak	Spacewatch	·	3.7 km	MPC · JPL
410860	2009 RS_{51}	—	September 15, 2009	Kitt Peak	Spacewatch	·	2.2 km	MPC · JPL
410861	2009 RE_{53}	—	September 15, 2009	Kitt Peak	Spacewatch	·	2.2 km	MPC · JPL
410862	2009 RM_{53}	—	September 15, 2009	Kitt Peak	Spacewatch	·	3.9 km	MPC · JPL
410863	2009 RJ_{70}	—	September 12, 2009	Kitt Peak	Spacewatch	EOS	1.6 km	MPC · JPL
410864	2009 RT_{72}	—	September 15, 2009	Kitt Peak	Spacewatch	·	1.5 km	MPC · JPL
410865	2009 RZ_{72}	—	September 15, 2009	Kitt Peak	Spacewatch	·	2.4 km	MPC · JPL
410866	2009 RL_{75}	—	September 15, 2009	Kitt Peak	Spacewatch	·	2.3 km	MPC · JPL
410867	2009 RU_{75}	—	September 15, 2009	Kitt Peak	Spacewatch	·	4.6 km	MPC · JPL
410868	2009 RC_{76}	—	September 15, 2009	Kitt Peak	Spacewatch	·	1.9 km	MPC · JPL
410869	2009 SS_{13}	—	September 16, 2009	Mount Lemmon	Mount Lemmon Survey	BRA	1.4 km	MPC · JPL
410870	2009 SR_{14}	—	April 18, 2007	Mount Lemmon	Mount Lemmon Survey	·	2.8 km	MPC · JPL
410871	2009 SW_{21}	—	September 18, 2009	Catalina	CSS	·	2.6 km	MPC · JPL
410872	2009 SW_{23}	—	September 16, 2009	Kitt Peak	Spacewatch	·	2.0 km	MPC · JPL
410873	2009 SM_{29}	—	September 16, 2009	Kitt Peak	Spacewatch	EOS	2.3 km	MPC · JPL
410874	2009 SB_{32}	—	September 16, 2009	Mount Lemmon	Mount Lemmon Survey	·	1.7 km	MPC · JPL
410875	2009 SB_{33}	—	September 16, 2009	Kitt Peak	Spacewatch	·	3.5 km	MPC · JPL
410876	2009 SH_{33}	—	September 16, 2009	Kitt Peak	Spacewatch	·	3.1 km	MPC · JPL
410877	2009 SB_{37}	—	September 16, 2009	Kitt Peak	Spacewatch	·	3.7 km	MPC · JPL
410878	2009 SH_{39}	—	September 16, 2009	Kitt Peak	Spacewatch	·	1.7 km	MPC · JPL
410879	2009 SN_{39}	—	September 16, 2009	Kitt Peak	Spacewatch	EOS	1.8 km	MPC · JPL
410880	2009 SZ_{42}	—	September 16, 2009	Kitt Peak	Spacewatch	·	2.3 km	MPC · JPL
410881	2009 SZ_{43}	—	September 16, 2009	Kitt Peak	Spacewatch	·	2.7 km	MPC · JPL
410882	2009 SM_{47}	—	September 16, 2009	Kitt Peak	Spacewatch	EOS	4.1 km	MPC · JPL
410883	2009 SZ_{47}	—	September 16, 2009	Kitt Peak	Spacewatch	EOS	2.1 km	MPC · JPL
410884	2009 SB_{49}	—	September 16, 2009	Mount Lemmon	Mount Lemmon Survey	·	2.5 km	MPC · JPL
410885	2009 SV_{51}	—	September 17, 2009	Mount Lemmon	Mount Lemmon Survey	EOS	1.7 km	MPC · JPL
410886	2009 SW_{56}	—	September 17, 2009	Kitt Peak	Spacewatch	·	3.5 km	MPC · JPL
410887	2009 SR_{59}	—	September 17, 2009	Kitt Peak	Spacewatch	·	3.0 km	MPC · JPL
410888	2009 SW_{65}	—	September 17, 2009	Kitt Peak	Spacewatch	·	1.8 km	MPC · JPL
410889	2009 SW_{66}	—	September 17, 2009	Kitt Peak	Spacewatch	·	3.3 km	MPC · JPL
410890	2009 SC_{68}	—	September 17, 2009	Kitt Peak	Spacewatch	·	2.5 km	MPC · JPL
410891	2009 SQ_{71}	—	September 17, 2009	Mount Lemmon	Mount Lemmon Survey	·	1.4 km	MPC · JPL
410892	2009 SC_{73}	—	August 15, 2009	Kitt Peak	Spacewatch	·	3.2 km	MPC · JPL
410893	2009 SJ_{74}	—	September 17, 2009	Kitt Peak	Spacewatch	·	1.6 km	MPC · JPL
410894	2009 SM_{74}	—	September 17, 2009	Kitt Peak	Spacewatch	·	2.8 km	MPC · JPL
410895	2009 SD_{88}	—	September 18, 2009	Kitt Peak	Spacewatch	·	2.3 km	MPC · JPL
410896	2009 SD_{97}	—	October 7, 2004	Kitt Peak	Spacewatch	·	1.6 km	MPC · JPL
410897	2009 SQ_{111}	—	September 18, 2009	Kitt Peak	Spacewatch	·	3.5 km	MPC · JPL
410898	2009 SX_{116}	—	September 18, 2009	Kitt Peak	Spacewatch	·	2.5 km	MPC · JPL
410899	2009 SU_{117}	—	September 18, 2009	Kitt Peak	Spacewatch	·	2.0 km	MPC · JPL
410900	2009 SE_{123}	—	September 18, 2009	Kitt Peak	Spacewatch	·	2.7 km	MPC · JPL

== 410901–411000 ==
back to top

Designation			Discovery			Properties		Ref
Permanent	Provisional	Named after	Date	Site	Discoverer(s)	Category	Diam.	Ref
410901	2009 SG_{127}	—	November 4, 2004	Kitt Peak	Spacewatch	EOS	1.6 km	MPC · JPL
410902	2009 SP_{130}	—	September 18, 2009	Kitt Peak	Spacewatch	·	2.1 km	MPC · JPL
410903	2009 SN_{131}	—	September 18, 2009	Kitt Peak	Spacewatch	·	3.7 km	MPC · JPL
410904	2009 SJ_{134}	—	September 18, 2009	Kitt Peak	Spacewatch	·	2.3 km	MPC · JPL
410905	2009 SQ_{140}	—	September 19, 2009	Kitt Peak	Spacewatch	·	2.2 km	MPC · JPL
410906	2009 SZ_{142}	—	September 19, 2009	Kitt Peak	Spacewatch	·	1.9 km	MPC · JPL
410907	2009 SC_{154}	—	October 23, 2004	Kitt Peak	Spacewatch	·	1.9 km	MPC · JPL
410908	2009 SR_{155}	—	September 20, 2009	Kitt Peak	Spacewatch	TIR	3.7 km	MPC · JPL
410909	2009 SO_{160}	—	September 20, 2009	Kitt Peak	Spacewatch	TIR	3.2 km	MPC · JPL
410910	2009 SN_{165}	—	September 22, 2009	Kitt Peak	Spacewatch	·	1.9 km	MPC · JPL
410911	2009 SX_{169}	—	September 17, 2009	Kitt Peak	Spacewatch	·	2.2 km	MPC · JPL
410912 Lisakaroline	2009 SV_{170}	Lisakaroline	September 26, 2009	Redshed	Bachleitner, H.	·	970 m	MPC · JPL
410913	2009 SS_{181}	—	April 11, 2007	Mount Lemmon	Mount Lemmon Survey	·	2.7 km	MPC · JPL
410914	2009 ST_{181}	—	September 21, 2009	Mount Lemmon	Mount Lemmon Survey	KOR	1.3 km	MPC · JPL
410915	2009 SN_{182}	—	August 27, 2009	Kitt Peak	Spacewatch	·	2.2 km	MPC · JPL
410916	2009 SO_{185}	—	September 21, 2009	Kitt Peak	Spacewatch	·	1.9 km	MPC · JPL
410917	2009 SJ_{186}	—	September 21, 2009	Kitt Peak	Spacewatch	·	2.2 km	MPC · JPL
410918	2009 SJ_{199}	—	September 22, 2009	Kitt Peak	Spacewatch	·	2.9 km	MPC · JPL
410919	2009 SF_{204}	—	September 22, 2009	Kitt Peak	Spacewatch	·	4.1 km	MPC · JPL
410920	2009 SE_{209}	—	September 15, 2009	Kitt Peak	Spacewatch	EOS	3.5 km	MPC · JPL
410921	2009 SP_{214}	—	September 23, 2009	Kitt Peak	Spacewatch	(31811)	3.6 km	MPC · JPL
410922	2009 SU_{225}	—	September 26, 2009	Mount Lemmon	Mount Lemmon Survey	·	1.5 km	MPC · JPL
410923	2009 SL_{231}	—	August 17, 2009	Kitt Peak	Spacewatch	EOS	1.7 km	MPC · JPL
410924	2009 SY_{231}	—	September 19, 2009	Kitt Peak	Spacewatch	EOS	1.7 km	MPC · JPL
410925	2009 SH_{232}	—	September 19, 2009	Kitt Peak	Spacewatch	LIX	3.4 km	MPC · JPL
410926	2009 SQ_{233}	—	April 29, 2003	Kitt Peak	Spacewatch	·	2.2 km	MPC · JPL
410927	2009 SC_{239}	—	September 17, 2009	Catalina	CSS	·	2.5 km	MPC · JPL
410928 Maidbronn	2009 ST_{242}	Maidbronn	September 28, 2009	Maidbronn	Haeusler, B.	·	2.3 km	MPC · JPL
410929	2009 SY_{250}	—	September 20, 2009	Kitt Peak	Spacewatch	·	2.5 km	MPC · JPL
410930	2009 SW_{253}	—	September 25, 2009	Kitt Peak	Spacewatch	·	2.1 km	MPC · JPL
410931	2009 SF_{254}	—	September 16, 2009	Kitt Peak	Spacewatch	EOS	1.7 km	MPC · JPL
410932	2009 SH_{263}	—	September 23, 2009	Mount Lemmon	Mount Lemmon Survey	·	2.8 km	MPC · JPL
410933	2009 SE_{265}	—	September 23, 2009	Mount Lemmon	Mount Lemmon Survey	·	2.7 km	MPC · JPL
410934	2009 SA_{270}	—	September 12, 2009	Kitt Peak	Spacewatch	·	2.3 km	MPC · JPL
410935	2009 SD_{270}	—	September 24, 2009	Kitt Peak	Spacewatch	BRA	1.7 km	MPC · JPL
410936	2009 SE_{270}	—	September 20, 2009	Kitt Peak	Spacewatch	·	2.2 km	MPC · JPL
410937	2009 SH_{271}	—	September 24, 2009	Kitt Peak	Spacewatch	H	410 m	MPC · JPL
410938	2009 SN_{277}	—	September 25, 2009	Kitt Peak	Spacewatch	ELF	3.9 km	MPC · JPL
410939	2009 SG_{281}	—	September 17, 2009	Kitt Peak	Spacewatch	·	2.5 km	MPC · JPL
410940	2009 SV_{284}	—	September 25, 2009	Mount Lemmon	Mount Lemmon Survey	KOR	1.2 km	MPC · JPL
410941	2009 SH_{287}	—	September 25, 2009	Kitt Peak	Spacewatch	·	1.8 km	MPC · JPL
410942	2009 SJ_{287}	—	September 25, 2009	Kitt Peak	Spacewatch	·	3.3 km	MPC · JPL
410943	2009 SZ_{293}	—	September 27, 2009	Kitt Peak	Spacewatch	·	3.0 km	MPC · JPL
410944	2009 SB_{294}	—	September 15, 2009	Kitt Peak	Spacewatch	KOR	1.2 km	MPC · JPL
410945	2009 ST_{296}	—	September 28, 2009	Kitt Peak	Spacewatch	·	2.8 km	MPC · JPL
410946	2009 ST_{311}	—	September 18, 2009	Mount Lemmon	Mount Lemmon Survey	KOR	1.3 km	MPC · JPL
410947	2009 SZ_{316}	—	August 28, 2009	Kitt Peak	Spacewatch	·	2.0 km	MPC · JPL
410948	2009 SK_{327}	—	September 25, 2009	Catalina	CSS	·	3.9 km	MPC · JPL
410949	2009 SH_{329}	—	September 16, 2009	Mount Lemmon	Mount Lemmon Survey	·	2.8 km	MPC · JPL
410950	2009 SS_{332}	—	October 4, 2004	Kitt Peak	Spacewatch	·	1.8 km	MPC · JPL
410951	2009 SM_{339}	—	January 15, 2005	Catalina	CSS	H	610 m	MPC · JPL
410952	2009 SD_{340}	—	September 16, 2009	Kitt Peak	Spacewatch	·	2.8 km	MPC · JPL
410953	2009 ST_{345}	—	September 19, 2009	Kitt Peak	Spacewatch	·	2.6 km	MPC · JPL
410954	2009 SX_{347}	—	September 17, 2009	Kitt Peak	Spacewatch	EOS	1.7 km	MPC · JPL
410955	2009 SN_{349}	—	September 21, 2009	Mount Lemmon	Mount Lemmon Survey	·	2.8 km	MPC · JPL
410956	2009 SP_{349}	—	September 23, 2009	Kitt Peak	Spacewatch	·	2.6 km	MPC · JPL
410957	2009 SU_{349}	—	September 18, 2009	Kitt Peak	Spacewatch	VER	2.8 km	MPC · JPL
410958	2009 SA_{353}	—	September 20, 2009	Kitt Peak	Spacewatch	·	2.6 km	MPC · JPL
410959	2009 SS_{353}	—	September 27, 2009	Kitt Peak	Spacewatch	·	2.1 km	MPC · JPL
410960	2009 SV_{353}	—	September 19, 2009	Kitt Peak	Spacewatch	·	3.5 km	MPC · JPL
410961	2009 SU_{356}	—	September 18, 2009	Kitt Peak	Spacewatch	·	2.4 km	MPC · JPL
410962	2009 SO_{358}	—	September 17, 2009	Kitt Peak	Spacewatch	·	1.6 km	MPC · JPL
410963	2009 SS_{360}	—	September 17, 2009	Kitt Peak	Spacewatch	EOS	2.0 km	MPC · JPL
410964	2009 SX_{360}	—	September 21, 2009	Mount Lemmon	Mount Lemmon Survey	·	1.8 km	MPC · JPL
410965	2009 TG_{4}	—	October 13, 2009	Tzec Maun	E. Schwab	·	2.7 km	MPC · JPL
410966	2009 TK_{7}	—	October 13, 2009	La Sagra	OAM	·	2.3 km	MPC · JPL
410967	2009 TX_{7}	—	October 1, 2009	Mount Lemmon	Mount Lemmon Survey	BRA	2.4 km	MPC · JPL
410968	2009 TO_{9}	—	October 14, 2009	Bisei SG Center	BATTeRS	·	4.0 km	MPC · JPL
410969	2009 TG_{12}	—	October 14, 2009	Catalina	CSS	EOS	2.1 km	MPC · JPL
410970	2009 TK_{19}	—	September 20, 2009	Mount Lemmon	Mount Lemmon Survey	·	2.4 km	MPC · JPL
410971	2009 TN_{19}	—	October 11, 2009	Mount Lemmon	Mount Lemmon Survey	·	2.8 km	MPC · JPL
410972	2009 TB_{35}	—	October 14, 2009	La Sagra	OAM	·	3.1 km	MPC · JPL
410973	2009 TW_{39}	—	October 14, 2009	Catalina	CSS	·	2.9 km	MPC · JPL
410974	2009 TJ_{41}	—	October 14, 2009	Catalina	CSS	·	2.2 km	MPC · JPL
410975	2009 TL_{41}	—	September 14, 2009	Kitt Peak	Spacewatch	·	3.8 km	MPC · JPL
410976	2009 TR_{44}	—	October 14, 2009	Kitt Peak	Spacewatch	·	2.6 km	MPC · JPL
410977	2009 TW_{45}	—	October 11, 2009	Mount Lemmon	Mount Lemmon Survey	VER	2.9 km	MPC · JPL
410978	2009 TE_{46}	—	October 14, 2009	Kitt Peak	Spacewatch	·	2.4 km	MPC · JPL
410979	2009 TH_{46}	—	October 1, 2009	Kitt Peak	Spacewatch	THM	2.1 km	MPC · JPL
410980	2009 TQ_{46}	—	October 14, 2009	Catalina	CSS	·	1.7 km	MPC · JPL
410981	2009 TE_{47}	—	October 12, 2009	La Sagra	OAM	·	2.7 km	MPC · JPL
410982	2009 TK_{47}	—	October 6, 2005	Mount Lemmon	Mount Lemmon Survey	·	2.8 km	MPC · JPL
410983	2009 UX	—	October 17, 2009	Mayhill	Nevski, V.	·	4.1 km	MPC · JPL
410984	2009 UR_{9}	—	October 16, 2009	Mount Lemmon	Mount Lemmon Survey	·	3.6 km	MPC · JPL
410985	2009 UQ_{15}	—	October 17, 2009	La Sagra	OAM	·	2.8 km	MPC · JPL
410986	2009 UQ_{17}	—	October 14, 2009	Catalina	CSS	·	3.1 km	MPC · JPL
410987	2009 UT_{21}	—	September 28, 2009	Mount Lemmon	Mount Lemmon Survey	·	1.7 km	MPC · JPL
410988	2009 US_{24}	—	October 18, 2009	Mount Lemmon	Mount Lemmon Survey	·	4.7 km	MPC · JPL
410989	2009 UE_{25}	—	October 18, 2009	Mount Lemmon	Mount Lemmon Survey	·	2.3 km	MPC · JPL
410990	2009 UH_{27}	—	October 21, 2009	Catalina	CSS	·	3.2 km	MPC · JPL
410991	2009 UQ_{27}	—	October 21, 2009	Catalina	CSS	·	2.3 km	MPC · JPL
410992	2009 UG_{32}	—	October 18, 2009	Mount Lemmon	Mount Lemmon Survey	·	2.6 km	MPC · JPL
410993	2009 UH_{35}	—	September 19, 2009	Mount Lemmon	Mount Lemmon Survey	·	4.3 km	MPC · JPL
410994	2009 UM_{35}	—	October 21, 2009	Mount Lemmon	Mount Lemmon Survey	·	3.4 km	MPC · JPL
410995	2009 UV_{37}	—	October 22, 2009	Mount Lemmon	Mount Lemmon Survey	EOS	1.9 km	MPC · JPL
410996	2009 UZ_{37}	—	October 22, 2009	Mount Lemmon	Mount Lemmon Survey	·	3.4 km	MPC · JPL
410997	2009 US_{39}	—	October 22, 2009	Catalina	CSS	·	4.9 km	MPC · JPL
410998	2009 UD_{44}	—	October 18, 2009	Mount Lemmon	Mount Lemmon Survey	·	2.2 km	MPC · JPL
410999	2009 UK_{44}	—	September 23, 2009	Kitt Peak	Spacewatch	·	4.1 km	MPC · JPL
411000	2009 UM_{44}	—	September 22, 2009	Mount Lemmon	Mount Lemmon Survey	·	2.7 km	MPC · JPL

back to top

== Meaning of names ==
As minor planet discoveries are confirmed, they are given a permanent number by the IAU's Minor Planet Center (MPC), and the discoverers can then submit names for them, following the IAU's naming conventions. The list below concerns those minor planets in the specified number-range that have received names, and explains the meanings of those names.

Official naming citations of newly named small Solar System bodies are approved and published in a bulletin by IAU's Working Group for Small Bodies Nomenclature (WGSBN). Before May 2021, citations were published in MPC's Minor Planet Circulars for many decades. Recent citations can also be found on the JPL Small-Body Database (SBDB). Until his death in 2016, German astronomer Lutz D. Schmadel compiled these citations into the Dictionary of Minor Planet Names (DMP) and regularly updated the collection.

Based on Paul Herget's The Names of the Minor Planets, Schmadel also researched the unclear origin of numerous asteroids, most of which had been named prior to World War II. This article incorporates text from this source, which is in the public domain: SBDB New namings may only be added to this list below after official publication as the preannouncement of names is condemned. The WGSBN publishes a comprehensive guideline for the naming rules of non-cometary small Solar System bodies.

Named minor planet	Provisional	This minor planet was named for...	Ref · Catalog
410475 Robertschulz	2008 DN	Robert Schulz (born 1972), an Austrian amateur astronomer and astrophotographer. Together with Wolfgang Neszmerak, he has built an observatory near the Holzleiten Saddle in Austria.	JPL · 410475
410619 Fabry	2008 PL_{6}	Charles Fabry (1867–1945), a French physicist and optician.	JPL · 410619
410817 Zaffino	2009 MN	Matt Zaffino (born 1961), an American meteorologist, whose nightly weathercast for a network TV station in Portland, Oregon, features tips for astronomical events and other science phenomena.	IAU · 410817
410835 Neszmerak	2009 QF_{26}	Wolfgang "Wolfman" Neszmerak (born 1969), an Austrian amateur astronomer, musician and photographer.	JPL · 410835
410912 Lisakaroline	2009 SV_{170}	Lisa Bachleitner (born 1990) and Karoline Bachleitner (born 1994) are the daughters of Austrian discoverer Hannes Bachleitner	JPL · 410912
410928 Maidbronn	2009 ST_{242}	Maidbronn, a small village in northern Bavaria, Germany, where the discovering Maidbronn Observatory is located.	JPL · 410928
