= Free State of Coburg =

German state (1918–1920)

Free State of Coburg Freistaat Coburg (German)
- 1918–1920
- Flag

- Location of Coburg (south) and Gotha (north) within the German Empire
- Coburg (southernmost of the 2 large medium-green areas) within the Thuringian states
- Capital: Coburg
- Area
  - Coordinates: 50°16′10″N 10°58′20″E
  - 1919: 562 km^{2} (217 sq mi)
- Population
  - 1919: 74,340
- Government
  - Type: Republic
- Historical era: Interwar period
  - Established: 1918
  - Disestablished: 1920
| Preceded by | Succeeded by |
| Saxe-Coburg and Gotha | Free State of Bavaria |
- Today part of: Germany

The Free State of Coburg (German: Freistaat Coburg) was a small, short-lived (1918–1920) central German state during the early years of the Weimar Republic. It was formed following the dissolution of the Duchy of Saxe-Coburg and Gotha during the German revolution of 1918–1919. Duke Charles Edward abdicated, and Coburg separated from Saxe-Gotha due in large part to political differences with its more radical neighbor. After Coburg's peaceful transition to a republican government, the majority of the population rejected a union with Thuringia, and Coburg merged instead with Bavaria on 1 July 1920.

== Predecessor state ==
The predecessor of the Free State of Coburg was the Duchy of Saxe-Coburg and Gotha. It was initially a double duchy, ruled in personal union, but with the enactment of the Constitution of 1852, the tie became a real union. The duchy from that point shared state ministers and had a common Landtag (state legislature), 11 of whose members represented Coburg and 19 Gotha. Saxe-Coburg and Gotha became a constituent state of the German Empire in 1871, with two seats in the Reichstag and one in the Bundesrat. Its last ruler was Duke Charles Edward (1900–1918).

== Revolution of 1918 ==
The Duchy of Saxe-Coburg and Gotha broke apart during the revolution of 1918–1919, which brought down the German Empire and all of Germany's royal houses at the end of World War I. The revolution began at the end of October 1918 with a sailors' mutiny at Kiel. The rebellious sailors set up a workers' and soldiers' council and in early November spread the revolt across the rest of Germany. Emperor Wilhelm II fled to Holland on 10 November, and councils quickly took power from the existing military, royal and civil authorities with little resistance or bloodshed.

The revolution reached Saxe-Coburg and Gotha on 8 November 1918 when soldiers at Gotha's military airfield set up a workers' and soldiers' council with the support of Gotha Reichstag member Wilhelm Bock. The next day, on Gotha's main market square, Bock proclaimed the council to be the provisional government of the new Gotha Republic and declared Duke Charles Edward deposed. A council of the people's deputies, all of whose members belonged to the radical left Independent Social Democratic Party (USPD), then took control in Gotha.

The situation in Coburg developed less dramatically. On 9 November a soldiers' council was formed, but only in response to orders from the acting Army General Command in Kassel. The council was led by Reinhold Artmann of the moderate Social Democratic Party (SPD). A formal workers' council, headed by Johann Stegner, also a member of the SPD, was not set up until 12 November. Until then the workers were represented by a provisional committee.

On 11 November a demonstration in Coburg organized by the SPD took place peacefully. Lieutenant Colonel Hans von Erffa, commander of the army reserve battalion stationed in the city, resigned at the request of the workers' and soldiers' representatives. The mayor of Coburg, confronted with the demand that he allow the representatives to oversee the city administration, quickly agreed. At the state ministry, however, Hermann Quarck and Ernst Fritsch refused to recognize the revolutionary committees but agreed to cooperate with them while remaining in control of the state government.

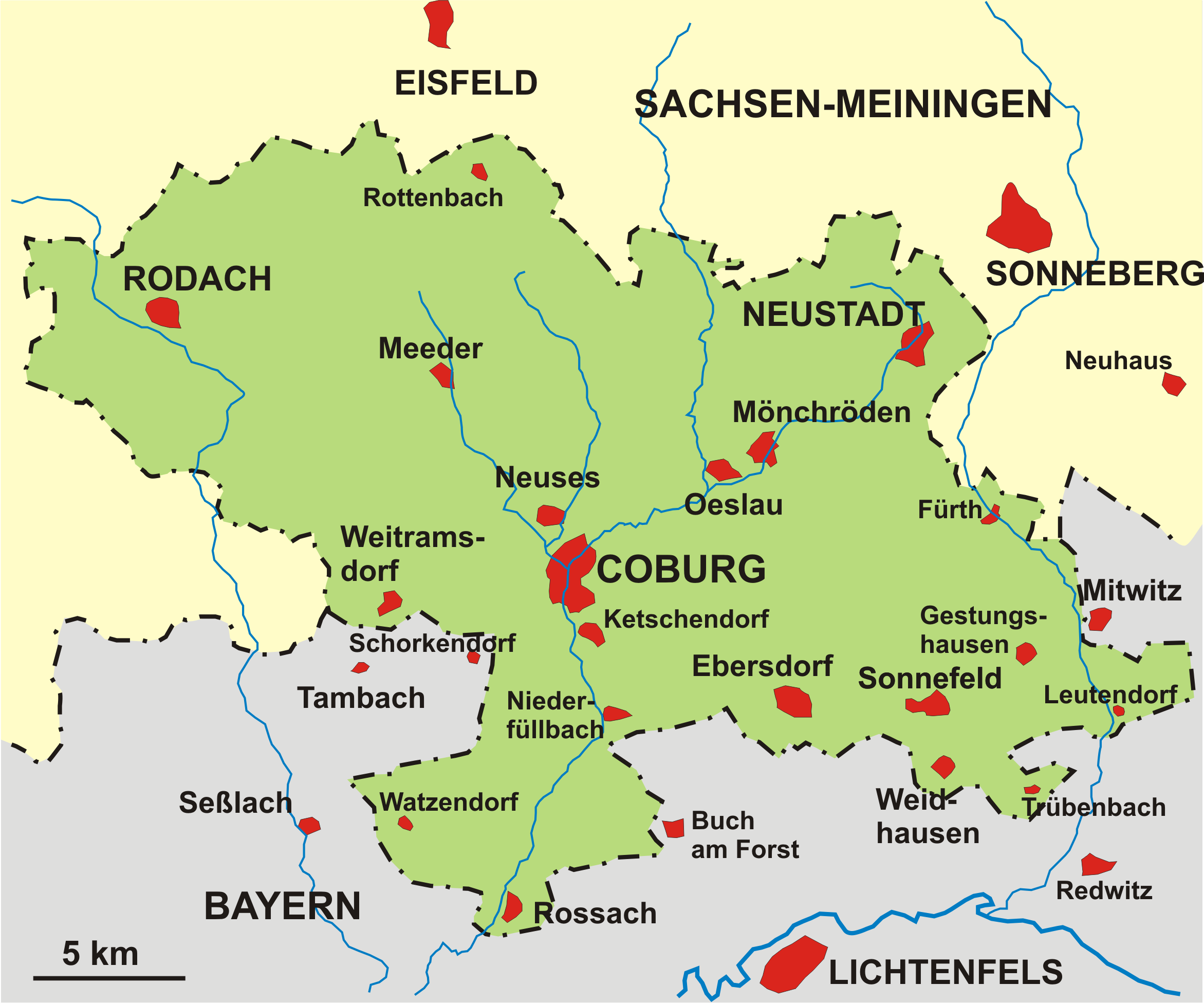
The Free State of Coburg. The gray-shaded region to the south is Bavaria ('Bayern' in German).

At a session of the joint parliament of Saxe-Coburg and Gotha on 14 November, members received a document signed by the Duke stating that he would relinquish his government duties but not that he was abdicating. Members of the USPD and the Gotha workers' and soldiers' councils then tried unsuccessfully to abolish the Duchy's constitution and replace it with a soviet republic. Following the vote, the combined parliament dissolved itself. That and the Duke's abdication removed two of the major links that had bound Coburg and Gotha together. Given their political differences, the separation of the two halves of the former duchy became all but inevitable.

The Coburg workers' and soldiers' council then formed a three-member executive committee. Along with the state ministry which it had allowed to continue in office, it made up the Coburg government. In the eyes of some historians, what had taken place in Coburg was not a true revolution:

One cannot speak of a real revolution, since the old elites remained in office and retained their honours. The fact that no real revolution took place can probably best be explained by the absence of an industrial proletariat in Coburg.

On 7 June 1919, Duke Charles Edward finalized a settlement with the Free State of Coburg over his properties and compensation. He was allowed to keep Callenberg Castle and a few smaller properties and received 1.5 million marks for the remainder that was taken over by the state, some of which went directly to Coburg and some to the Coburg State Foundation (Coburger Landesstiftung).

== New Landtag ==
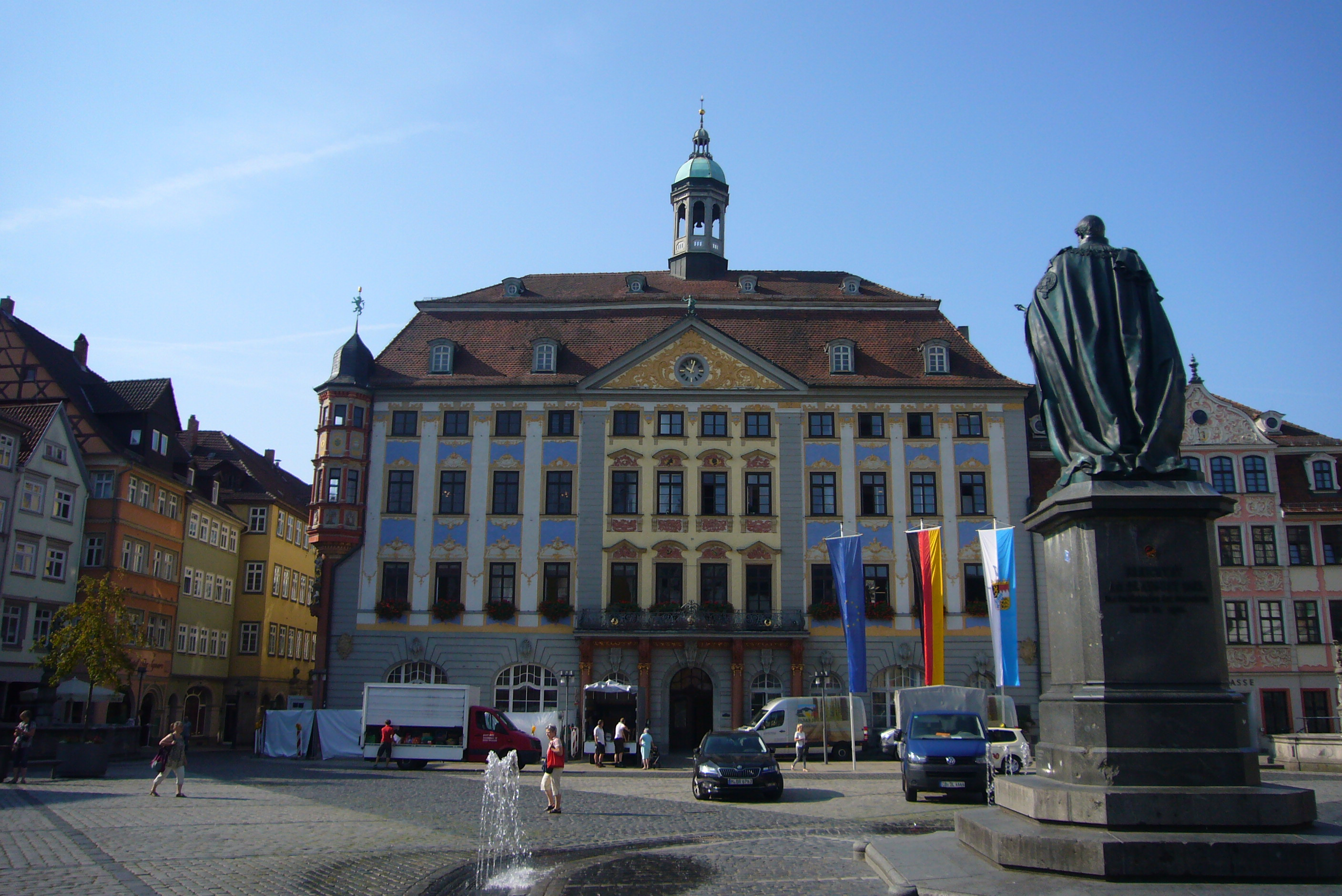
Coburg's city hall (Rathaus)

The weak position of the workers' and soldiers' council allowed Hermann Quarck at the state ministry to assume control of affairs in Coburg by 21 November. At the council's request, he set 9 February 1919 as the date for an election to a new state parliament. The voting was held under universal (male and female), equal and secret suffrage using proportional representation. The SPD won 58.6% of the votes; the remaining 41.4% went to a combined list of the liberal German Democratic Party (DDP), the conservative German National People's Party (DNVP) and the Coburg Farmers' Association.

On 10 March 1919, the newly elected state assembly passed a constitution for Coburg based on a draft written by Quarck. It established a republican government with a one-chamber legislature (the Landtag) and a three-member ministerial government dependent on the confidence of the Landtag. Quarck, as both lead minister and head of the administration, continued in his dominant role. That ended on 11 July when the constitution was altered to prohibit a personal union of the ministerial and administrative leadership. The SPD forced Quarck out on 19 July 1919 . Franz Klinger of the SPD took over as head of the ministry, and a member of the DDP took Klinger's previous ministerial position.

== Final separation from Saxe-Gotha ==
Despite the abdication of the ducal family and the dissolution of the combined parliament, Coburg and Saxe-Gotha remained tied together by their shared judiciary and joint representation at the federal level. An agreement on the regulation of their common affairs was signed on 12 April 1919, but it took until 1924 for all of the necessary work to be completed. Technically, "Coburg was no longer part of the Reich, which adhered to the system of states of the empire, but was considered an independent state within the loose confederation of Thuringian states."

== Decision to join Bavaria ==
Coburg's leadership knew that the state was too small to be economically viable. Initially, three possibilities presented themselves: union with Prussia, with the newly forming state of Thuringia, or with Bavaria. Prussia was indifferent, Thuringian interests could offer statements of intention but no guarantees, but Bavaria willingly made concessions regarding improved transportation links, Coburg's integration into Bavaria's food economy, and retention of its existing rights respecting such cultural institutions as schools, museums and theaters.

The Landtag had decided to leave the decision on whether to join Thuringia or Bavaria to the people. On 30 November 1919, the first democratic referendum in Germany was held to determine Coburg's future. With a voter turnout of 75%, 88% of the population voted against becoming part of Thuringia and therefore to merge with Bavaria. One key reason behind the outcome was that many Coburgers hoped that Bavaria, with its strong agricultural sector, could best help end the five years of war-related food shortages under which they were still suffering.

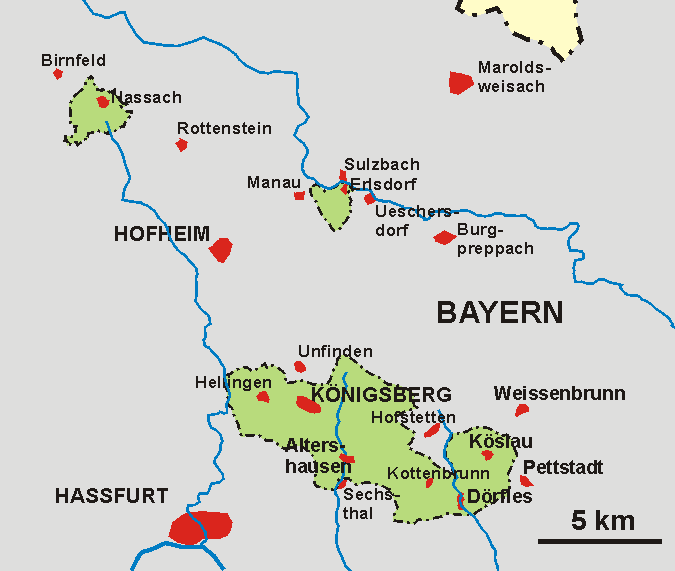
The exclave of Königsberg

The Bavarian parliament approved the agreement with Coburg on 11 March 1920; Coburg's Landtag followed on the 18th. The final approval came from the federal Reichsrat, the upper house of Germany's parliament which represented the interests of the states. That took place on 20 April, the same day on which it passed the legislation that created Thuringia.

With the union of the Free States of Coburg and Bavaria on 1 July 1920, almost 600 years of political autonomy of the Coburger Land came to an end. According to the treaty, the Free State of Coburg was assigned to the administrative district of Upper Franconia (Oberfranken). The exclave Königsberg region with the town of Königsberg, as well as the communities of Altershausen, Dörflis, Erlsdorf, Hellingen, Kottenbrunn and Nassach, became part of the district of Hofheim in Lower Franconia (Unterfranken).

Coburg's decision to unite with Bavaria had unforeseen consequences at the end of the Second World War in 1945. The territory of the former Free State of Coburg became part of the American Occupation Zone, while Thuringia fell to the Soviet Occupation Zone and later East Germany.

== Government ==
=== State ministry ===
In office from 10 March 1919 to 1 July 1920

- Reinhold Artmann (1870 – 1960) (SPD)
- Franz Xavier Klingler (1875 – 1933) (SPD)
- [Carl] Hermann Quarck (1873 – 1932) (National Liberal), until 8 July 1919
- Hans Woldemar Schack (1878 – 1946) (DDP), after 11 July 1919

=== Deputies of the state assembly ===
Social Democratic Party of Germany (SPD):

- Reinhold Artmann (1870 – 1960) from Coburg, carpenter
- Erhard Kirchner (1866 – 1927) from Neustadt bei Coburg, manager at Allgemeine Ortskrankenkasse [General Local Health Insurance] (AOK) and President of the State Assembly
- Franz Xavier Klingler (1875 – 1933) from Coburg, editor of the newspaper, the Coburger Volksblatt [Coburger People's Bulletin]
- Bernhard Lauer (1867 – 1927) from Neustadt bei Coburg, employee at AOK
- Hermann Mämpel (1866 – 1944) from Coburg, administrative assistant at AOK
- Johann Stegner (1866 – 1954) from Frohnlach, brewer and innkeeper
- Carl Wendt (1887 – 1936) from Rodach, machinist

Other parties and independents:

- Max Oscar Arnold (1854 – 1938) from Neustadt bei Coburg, manufacturer of dolls
- Hans Woldemar Schack (1878 – 1946) from Coburg, Judge of the District Courts
- Ernst Külbel (1863 – 1938) from Coburg, maltmaker
- Gustav Hess (1874 – 1940) from Neuses bei Coburg, farmer

== Towns and communities ==
- 4 towns: Coburg (capital), Neustadt bei Coburg, Rodach bei Coburg, Königsberg
- 139 communities: Ahlstadt, Ahorn, Aicha, Beiersdorf, Bertelsdorf, Beuerfeld, Bieberbach, Birkach am Forst, Birkig, Blumenrod, Boderndorf, Breitenau, Brüx, Buchenrod, Callenberg, Cortendorf, Creidlitz, Dörfles, Drossenhausen, Ebersdorf bei Coburg, Ebersdorf bei Neustadt, Einberg, Elsa, Esbach, Fechheim, Fischbach, Fornbach, Friesendorf, Frohnlach, Fürth am Berg, Gauerstadt, Gestungshausen, Gossenberg, Grattstadt, Großgarnstadt, Großheirath, Großwalbur, Grub am Forst, Haarbrücken, Haarth, Hassenberg, Heldritt, Herbartsdorf, Höhn, Hof an der Steinach, Horb an der Steinach, Horb bei Fürth am Berg, Kemmaten, Ketschenbach, Ketschendorf, Kipfendorf, Kleingarnstadt, Kleinwalbur, Kösfeld, Lempertshausen, Leutendorf, Lützelbuch, Mährenhausen, Meeder, Meilschnitz, Meschenbach, Mirsdorf, Mittelberg, Mittelwasungen, Mödlitz, Mönchröden, Moggenbrunn, Neida, Neukirchen, Neuses am Brand, Neuses an den Eichen, Neuses bei Coburg, Neu- und Neershof, Niederfüllbach, Oberfüllbach, Oberlauter, Obersiemau, Oberwasungen, Oberwohlsbach, Oeslau, Oettingshausen, Ottowind, Plesten, Rögen, Rohrbach, Rossach, Rossfeld, Roth am Forst, Rothenhof, Rottenbach, Rudelsdorf, Rüttmannsdorf, Schafhof, Scherneck, Scheuerfeld, Schönstädt, Schweighof, Seidmannsdorf, Sonnefeld, Spittelstein, Steinach an der Steinach, Stöppach, Sulzdorf, Sülzfeld, Thann, Tiefenlauter, Tremersdorf, Trübenbach, Unterlauter, Untersiemau, Unterwasungen, Unterwohlsbach, Waldsachsen, Waltersdorf, Watzendorf, Weickenbach, Weidach, Weidhausen bei Coburg, Weimersdorf, Weischau, Weißenbrunn am Forst, Weißenbrunn vorm Wald, Weitramsdorf, Wellmersdorf, Wiesenfeld, Wildenheid, Wörlsdorf, Wohlbach, Wüstenahorn, Zedersdorf, Zeickhorn, Ziegelsdorf
- Exclave of the District of Königsberg: Communities of Altershausen, Dörflis, Erlsdorf, Hellingen, Köslau, Kottenbrunn and Nassach.

== Bibliography ==
- (in German) Harald Bachmann, “75 Jahre Coburg bei Bayern” [“Coburg’s 75 Years with Bavaria”], in: Frankenland. Zeitschrift für fränkische Landeskunde und Kulturpflege 1995 [Franconia: Journal of Cultural Studies and Preservation 1995], Heft [Issue] 3, ISSN 0015-9905, p. 143–150 (PDF; 1,56 MB).
- (in German) Carl-Christian Dressel, Die Bestimmungen des Staatsvertrags. Entwicklung, Hintergründe, Folgen - unter besonderer Berücksichtigung der Leistung von Franz Klingler [The Provisions of the Treaty: Development, Background, Consequences – with Special Emphasis on the Performance of Franz Klingler], Thesis in History, Gymnasium Casimirianum Coburg, Class Years of 1987–1989 (Coburg: Author, 1989)
- (in German) Jürgen Erdmann, Coburg, Bayern und das Reich 1918–1923 [Coburg, Bavaria and the Empire 1918–1923] (Coburg: Druckhaus und Vesteverlag [Printing and Publishing House of] A. Rossteutscher, 1969), (Coburger Heimatkunde und Landesgeschichte Reihe 2, 22 [Coburger Studies of State and Local History Series 2, Nr 22], ZDB-ID 1151614-8) (simultaneously: University of Würzburg, Dissertation, 1969: Coburg in den Anfangsjahren der Weimarer Republik 1918–1923 [Coburg in the Beginning of the Weimar Republic Years 1918–1923])
- (in German) Rainer Hambrecht, ed., Nicht durch Krieg, Kauf oder Erbschaft [Not by War, Sale or Inheritance]: Ausstellung des Staatsarchivs Coburg anlasslich der 75. Wiederkehr der Vereinigung Coburgs mit Bayern am 1. Juli 1920 [Catalogue of the Exhibition at the State Archives of Coburg for the 75th Anniversary of the Union of Coburg with Bavaria on 1 July 1920] (München: Staatlichen Archive Bayern [Bavarian State Archives], 1995).
- (in German) Esther Reinhart, Max Oscar Arnold (1854-1938). Leben und Wirken für das Coburger Land [Life and Work for the Coburger Land] (Coburg: Historische Gesellschaft [Historical Society of] Coburg, 2007), ISBN 3-9810350-3-8, (Schriftenreihe der Historischen Gesellschaft Coburg e.V., 21 Band [Series of the Historical Society of Coburg, Inc., Volume 21).
- (in German) Harald Sandner, Coburg im 20. Jahrhundert. Die Chronik über die Stadt Coburg und das Haus Sachsen-Coburg und Gotha vom 1. Januar 1900 bis zum 31. December 1999 – von der „guten alten Zeit“ bis zur Schwelle des 21. Jahrhunderts. Gegen das Vergessen [Coburg in the 20th Century: The Chronicle of the City of Coburg and the House of Saxe-Coburg and Gotha from 1 January 1900 to 31 December 1999 – from the “Good Old Days” to the Dawn of the 21st Century. Lest We Forget] (Coburg: Verlagsanstalt Neue Presse [New Press Publishing Co.], 2002), ISBN 3-00-006732-9
- (in German) Jörg Siegmund, “Zwischen Konsens und Blockadepolitik. Die Übergangsparlamente in Sachsen-Gotha und Sachsen-Coburg” [“Between Consensus and Obstructionism: The Transitional Parliament in Saxe-Gotha and Saxe-Coburg”], in: Harald Mittelsdorf (ed.): Die vergessenen Parlamente. Landtage und Gebietsvertretungen in den Thüringer Staaten und Gebieten 1919 bis 1923 [The Forgotten Parliaments: State Parliaments and Regional Representation in the Thuringian States and Territories from 1919 to 1923], Herausgegeben vom Thüringer Landtag [Publication of the State Parliament of Thuringia] (Rudolstadt, Germany: Verlag Hain, 2002), ISBN 3-89807-038-7, (Schriften zur Geschichte des Parlamentarismus in Thüringen [Writings on the History of Parliamentarianism in Thuringia] 19), p. 121–160.
