= Creidlitz =

- Ortsteil of Coburg
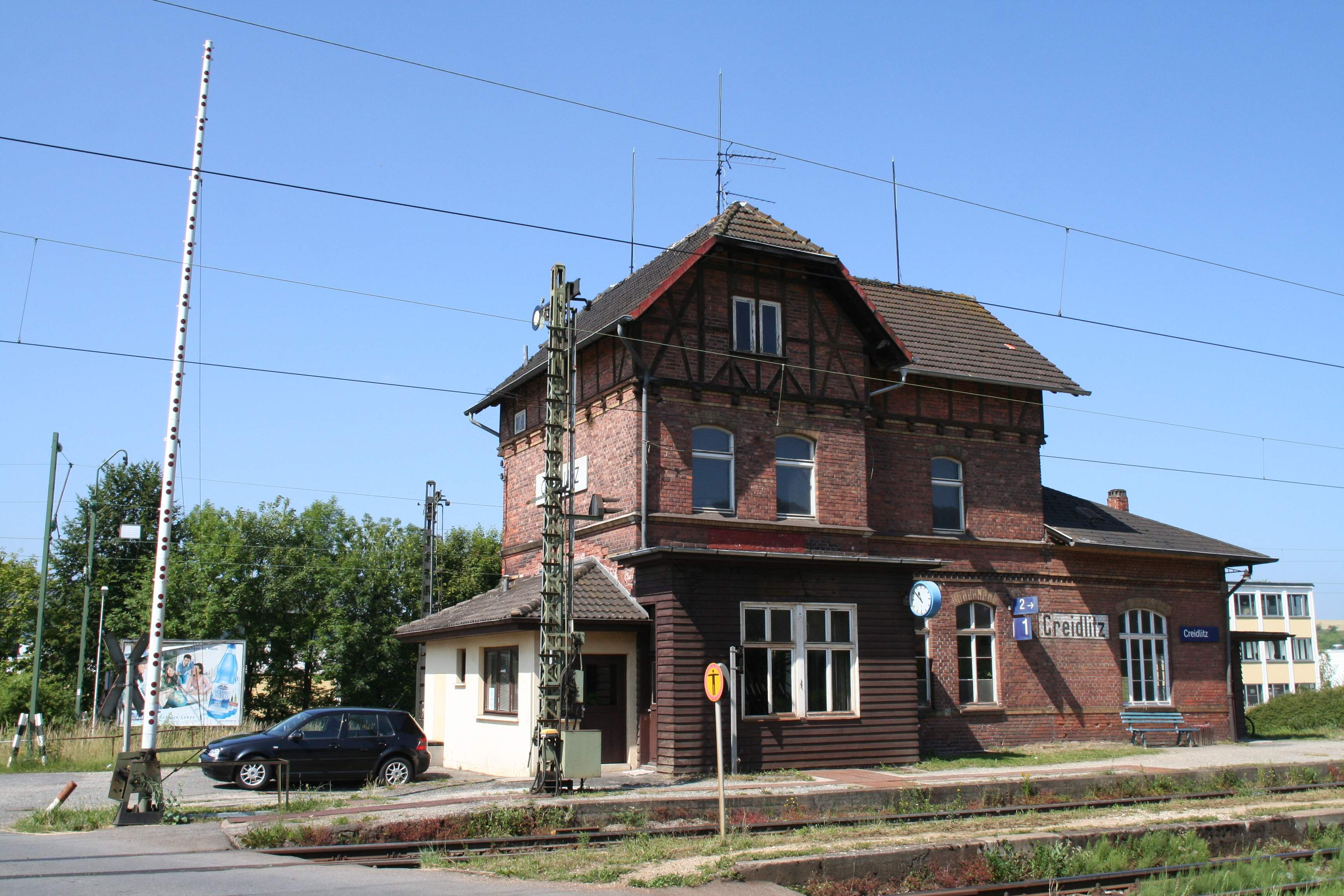
- Creidlitz station
- Interactive map of Creidlitz
- Location within Germany Location within Bavaria
- Coordinates: 50°14′4″N 10°58′50″E
- Country: Germany
- State: Bavaria
- Admin. region: Oberfranken
- Town: Coburg

Area
  - Total: 2.3 km^{2} (0.89 sq mi)
- Elevation: 300 m (980 ft)

Population (2010)
  - Total: 1,705
  - Density: 740/km^{2} (1,900/sq mi)
- Time zone: UTC+01:00 (CET)
  - Summer (DST): UTC+02:00 (CEST)
- Postal codes: 96450
- Dialling codes: 09571
- Vehicle registration: CO

Creidlitz is a southern suburb of 1705 inhabitants (30 June 2010) of the city of Coburg in the county of Upper Franconia in the state of Bavaria in Germany.

== Geography ==
It is 4 kilometers (2.5 miles) south of Coburg and at the northern edge of the region of Itzgrund. Creidlitz is bordered by Ahorn in the west, Niederfüllbach in the south, Grub am Forst in the east and by Ketschendorf in the north.

== History ==
Creidlitz was first mentioned in about 870 as Grilizi, the name is of Slavic origin. It belongs to Bavaria Slavica. On 1 July 1972 Creidlitz merged with the city of Coburg. The last mayor was Hans Blümlein from 1946 to 1972.

== Transport ==
=== Car ===
Bundesstraße 4 [Federal Highway] runs in the west, while Kreisstraße [District Road] COs 12 goes through the village itself.

=== Railways ===
Creidlitz station is on the Eisenach–Lichtenfels main line, which opened in 1859. In 1900, the Itz Valley Railway from Creidlitz to Rossach via Untersiemau and Großheirath got into operation. The line, on which there were passenger services until 1984, was lifted in 2005.

The station building is a protected monument.
