= Itz Valley Railway =

Former railway line in Germany

Creidlitz–Rossach
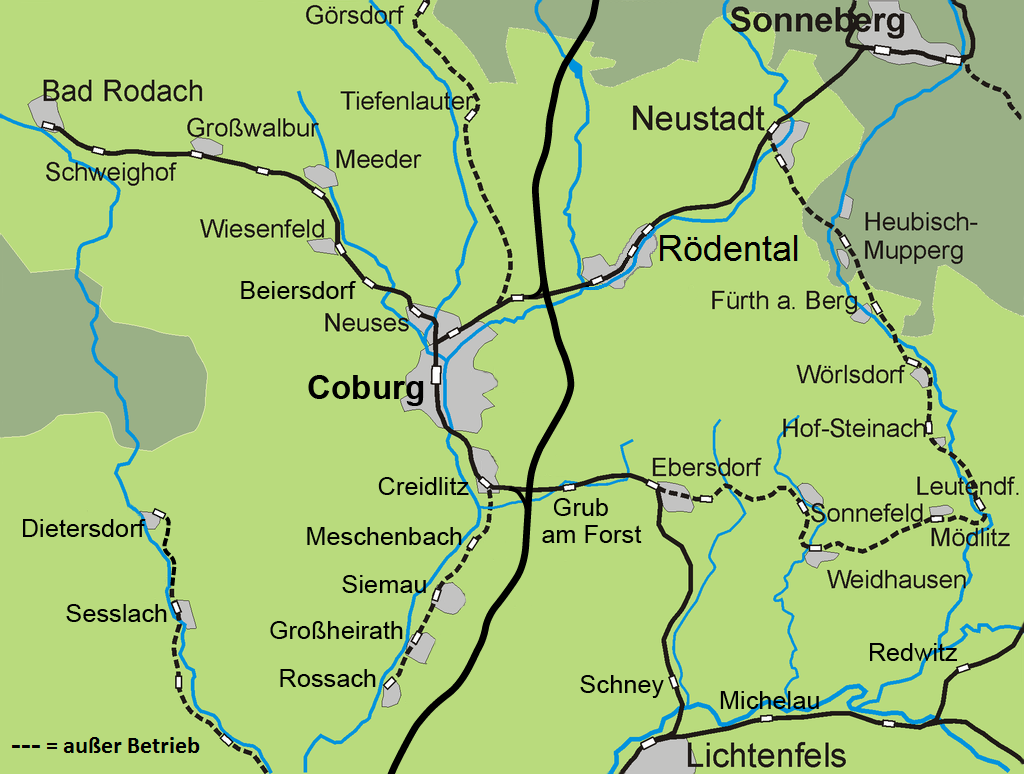

Overview
- Line number: 5123

Service
- Route number: 832 (1992)

Technical
- Line length: 8 km (5.0 mi)
- Track gauge: 1,435 mm (4 ft 8 1/2 in) standard gauge
- Minimum radius: 300 m (328 yd 0 ft)
- Maximum incline: 1 %

The Itz Valley Railway (German: Itzgrundbahn) was a former, 8 kilometre long branch line in Bavaria, Germany, running from Creidlitz, in the borough of Coburg, to Rossach in the municipality of Großheirath.

The single-tracked line has a railway gauge of 1,435 mm (4 ft 8 1/2 in) standard gauge and was not electrified.

== History ==
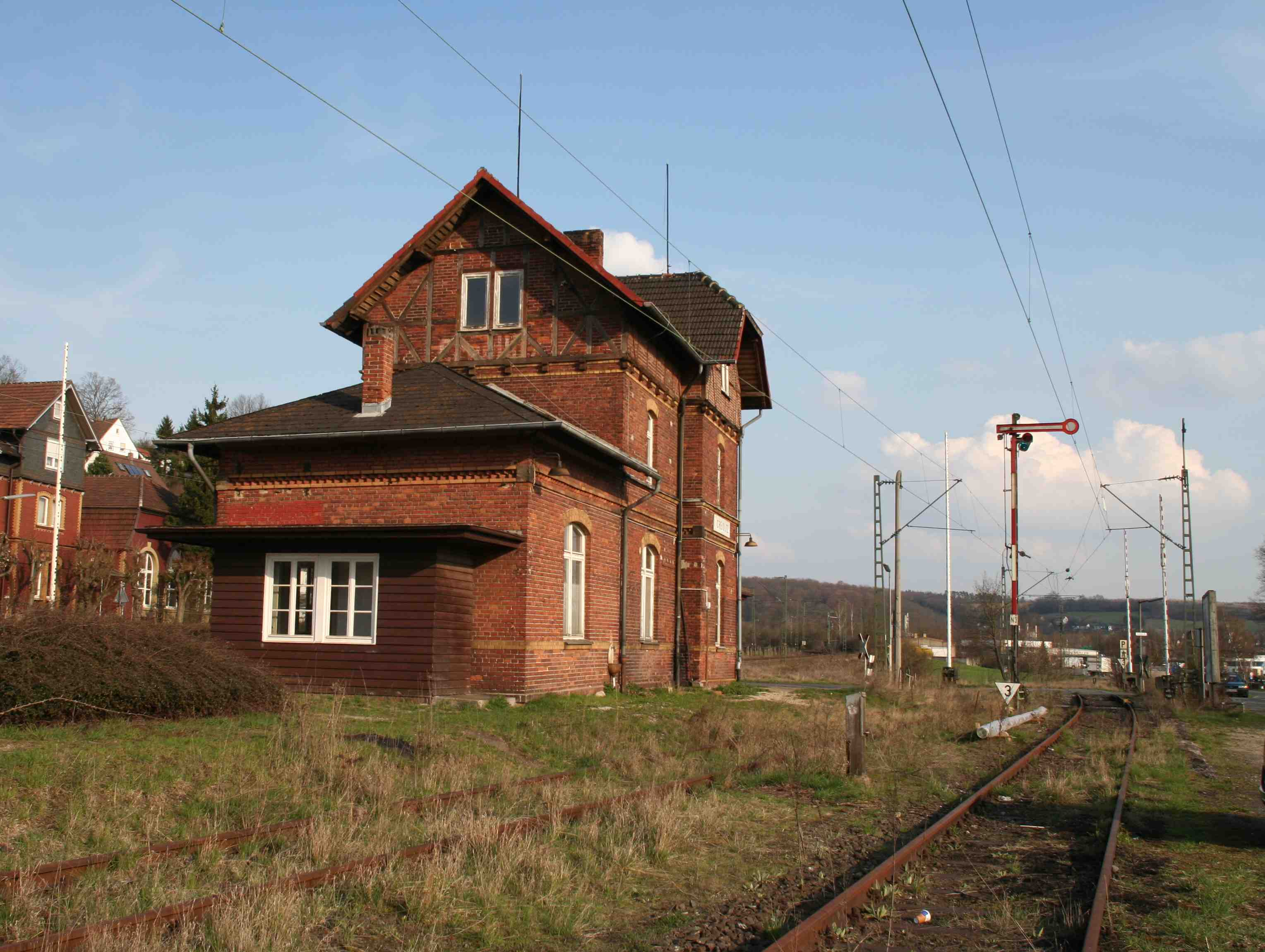
Creidlitz station and the electrified line to Rossach

It took eight years of effort before the communities of the Duchy of Saxe-Coburg and Gotha in the Itz valley were given their railway connexion, branching off the Werra Railway near Creidlitz, on 4 December 1900. They had to make the land available for the railway at no cost.

The line initially belonged to the Prussian state railways and was managed until 1945 by the Erfurt Reichsbahn division. Attempts to extend the route to Kaltenbrunn in the lower Itz valley as far as the Bavarian line from Breitengüßbach to Dietersdorf, which had been opened in 1913, were never realised although it was only 6.7 kilometres distant. To begin with, it was shelved because it would compete with the 15 kilometre longer main line from Lichtenfels to Bamberg. Later attempts foundered due to a lack of funding and, in the end, the fact that the Lichtenfels–Coburg line was electrified.

In the Deutsche Reichsbahn Gesellschaft's 1934 railway timetable the line was listed as 165e and four pairs of passenger trains were scheduled daily each with a journey time of about 30 minutes for the 13 kilometres between Coburg and Rossach.

In the Deutsche Bundesbahn's timetable in 1970 the line was listed as no. 419e; after 1992 it became no. 832. Until 1970 the DB used Class 86 steam engines and Class VT 70 railbuses, later they deployed diesel engines of Classes 280 and 211, as well as Uerdingen railbuses. From 1982 weekend services were withdrawn and on 2 June 1984 passenger services ceased entirely.

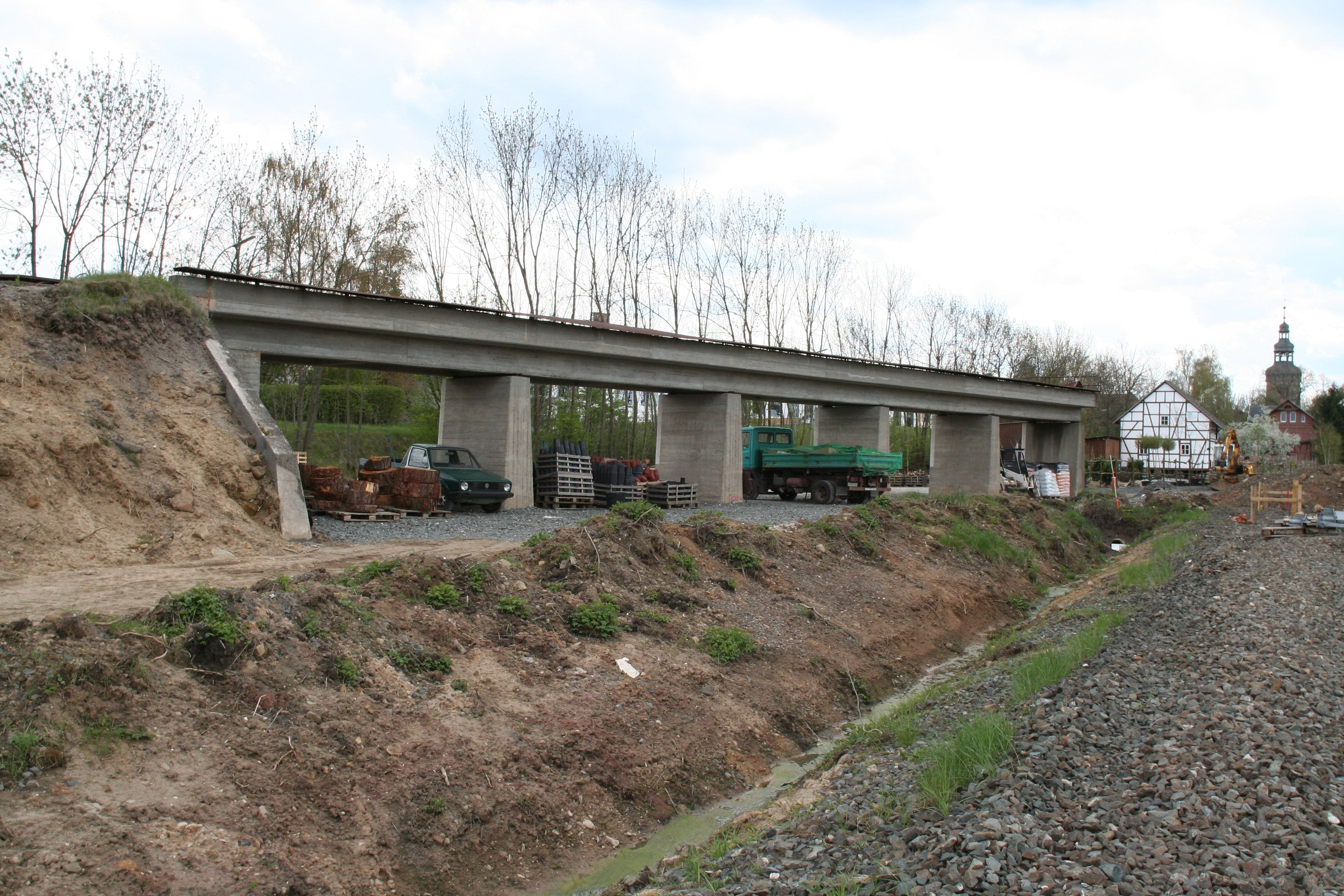
Loading ramp in Großheirath

Goods train predominate in Großheirath due to the loading of clay at the Gottfried brick factory (Klinkerwerk Gottfried) where a supported loading ramp and weighbridge was available. In addition, there were sidings in Niederfüllbach for a haulage firm and a steel merchant. Even as late as 10 June 2001 around 15,000 tonnes of steel were delivered annually to the steel merchant. The two kilometre long section from Großheirath to Rossach was closed on 1 September 1995, In April 2001 authority was given for the closure and cessation of operations on the remaining section and on 31 Juli 2001 for the complete closure of the line. In 2005 the line was lifted; a cycle path has been established in places on the old line.

== Route ==
The steepest incline on the route is 1:100 and the smallest curve radius is 300 metres. The stations in Siemau-Scherneck, Großheirath and Rossach were built to a standard brick design. Due to its proximity to Creidlitz station the halt at Niederfüllbach was shut again soon after the line opened.

== Sources ==
- Wolfgang Bleiweis, Stefan Goldschmidt und Bernd Schmitt: Eisenbahn im Coburger Land. Verlag Eisenbahnfreunde Steinachtalbahn-Coburg, Coburg 1996, ISBN 3-9802748-4-5
- Bernd Schmitt: Die Itzgrundbahn. Geschichte der Nebenbahn von Creidlitz nach Rossach. Eisenbahnfachbuch-Verlag Michael Resch, Neustadt 2001, ISBN 3-9807748-1-3
