= Ketschendorf (Coburg) =

- Stadtteil of Coburg
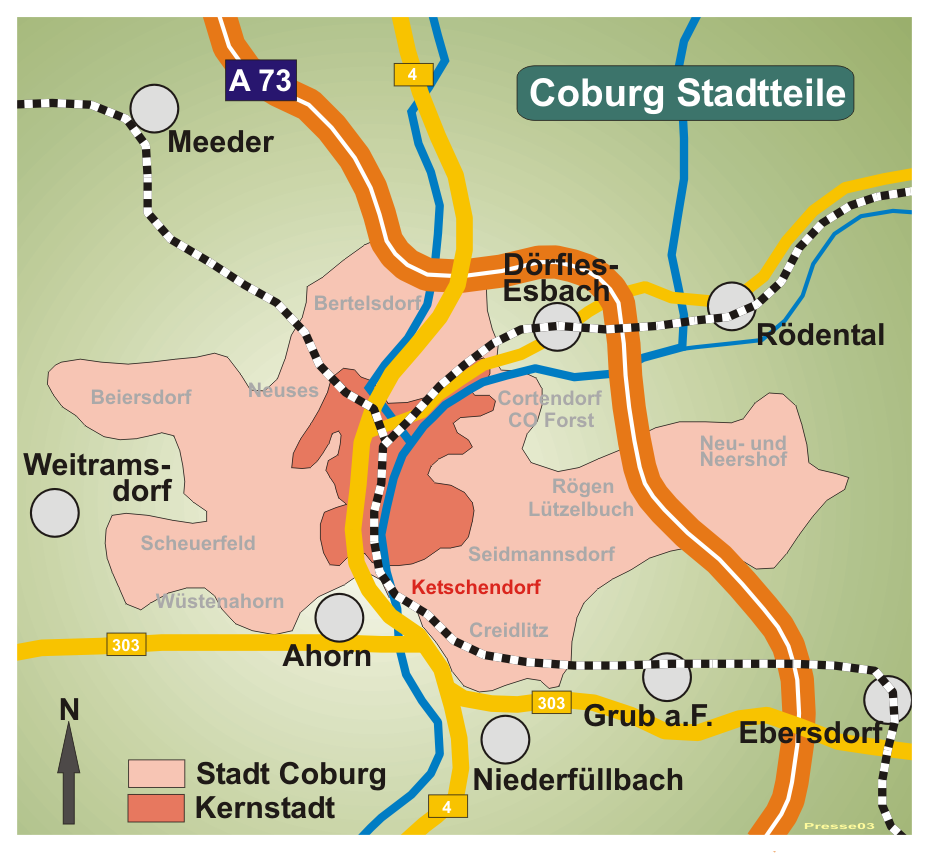
- Location of Ketschendorf in the town of Coburg
- Interactive map of Ketschendorf
- Location within Germany Location within Bavaria
- Coordinates: 50°14′40″N 10°58′26″E
- Country: Germany
- State: Bavaria
- Admin. region: Oberfranken
- District: Urban district
- Town: Coburg

Area
  - Total: 1.79 km^{2} (0.69 sq mi)
- Elevation: 300 m (980 ft)

Population (2010)
  - Total: 1,631
  - Density: 911/km^{2} (2,360/sq mi)
- Time zone: UTC+01:00 (CET)
  - Summer (DST): UTC+02:00 (CEST)
- Postal codes: 96450
- Dialling codes: 09561

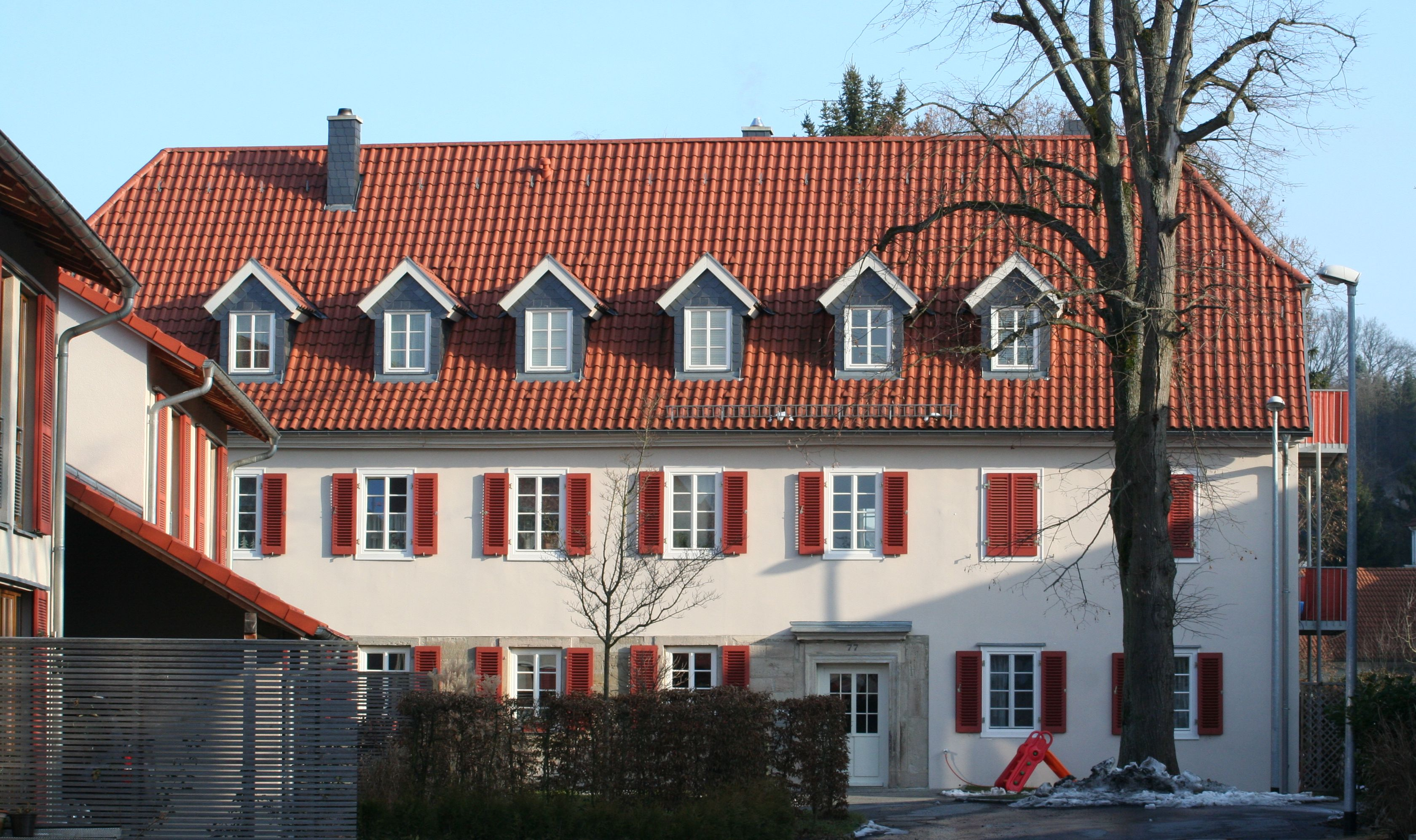
Former Provost's Estate

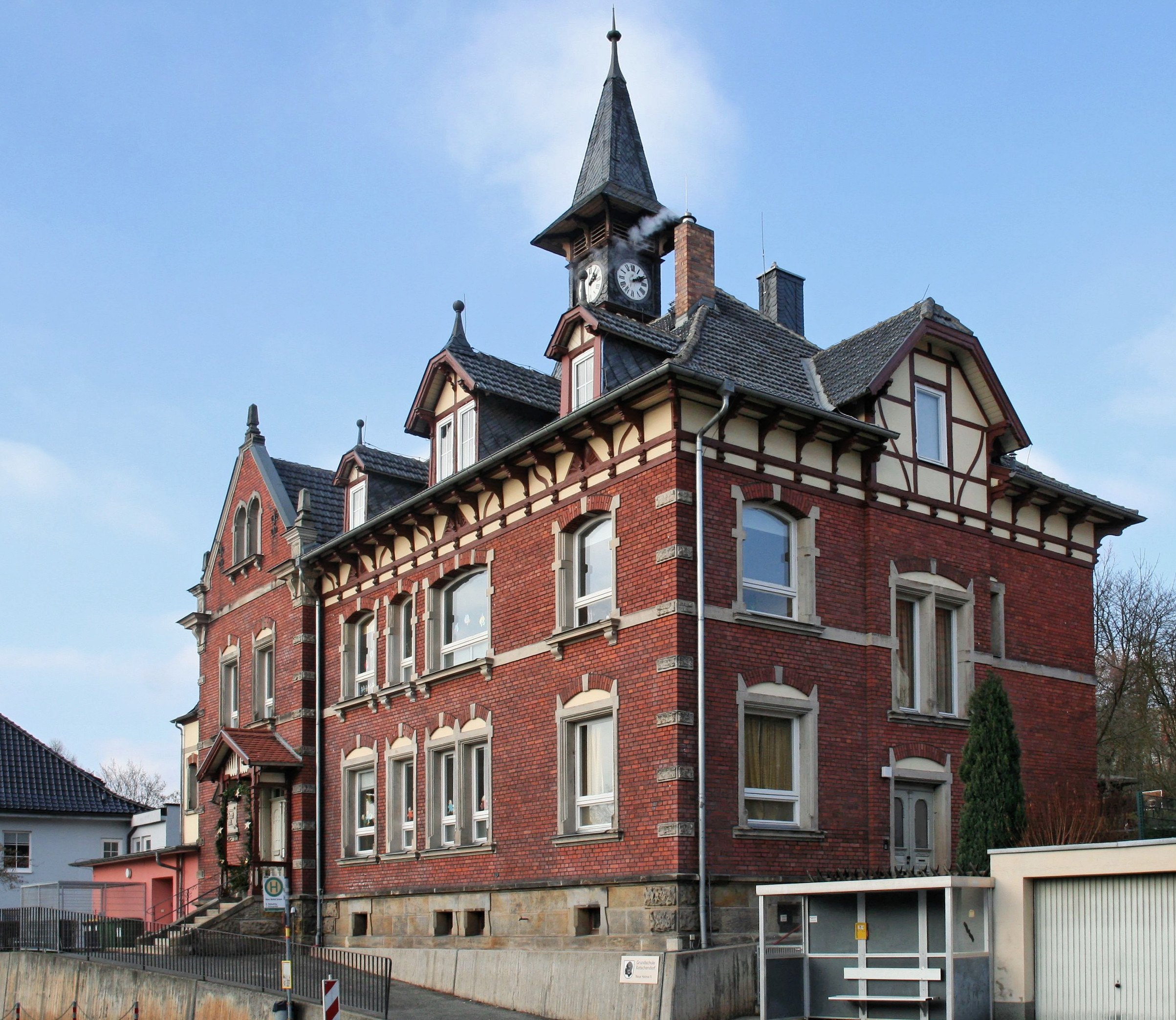
Neue-Heimat-Schule (New Home School) in 1902, now the Volksschule Coburg-Ketschendorf (Grundschule) (Coburg-Ketschendorf Public School or Elementary School)

Ketschendorf is a southern suburb of the city of Coburg in the county of Upper Franconia, in the state of Bavaria in Germany.

== Geography ==
The village is adjacent to the city of Coburg, along with the Coburger neighborhoods of Creidlitz and Seidmannsdorf as well as the municipalities of Ahorn and Grub am Forst. On June 30, 2010, Ketschendorf had 1631 inhabitants, giving a population density of 911 inhabitants per km ². The place is located above the mouth of the three-mile-long Ketschenbach [Ketschen Brook] at the Itz River, which originates in Seidmannsdorf. The Ketschendorfer Straße [Ketschendorf Road], the connecting route to Coburg, was built between 1786 and 1794 as a state road. Previously it was used as the present High Street.

== History ==
The first positively documented mention of Ketschendorf is dated from the year 1100. In the copy books (Cartulary) of the Coburg provost of the Benedictine Cloister of Saalfeld, which are preserved in the State Archives of Coburg, there is a copy of the text of a document from 1100. In this document, the nobleman Sibot and his wife Hildegunt in “Chezzendorf” appropriated a Zinsgut [feudal estate] of 30 Morgen [9 hectares or 22.24 acres] of land. The owner of the provost's estate at Ketschendorfer Straße 77 was first detected in 1518. The nucleus of the village was built around 1660. Over the centuries, the settlement area developed along the Ketschenbach to the east and, in 1445, had about 60 settlers.

On September 28, 1632, General Wallenstein during the siege of the Veste Coburg made Ketschendorf his personal quarters. Two years later, General Lamboy destroyed the whole place. The first construction of a farm was in 1651, and only in 1725 the existing buildings of the village were restored to what they once were before the Thirty Years' War. The construction of the Schloss Ketschendorf in 1804 as a summer palace for Duchess Augusta, wife of Francis, Duke of Saxe-Coburg-Saalfeld, was followed in the 19th Century by the large number of visitors, giving this predominantly rural village an economic boom. In 1903, at the northern edge of the Ketschendorfer area, the new state hospital was opened. In 1904 and 1905, factories were started on the Postweg [Post Way] to make cartons and cases.

A single school was opened in 1902. Previously, schoolchildren had to walk from Ketschendorf to Seidmannsdorf for school. In 1901, the school was built in the neo-Renaissance style and later became the Neue-Heimat-Schule [New Home School]. It is now Volksschule Coburg-Ketschendorf (Grundschule) [Coburg-Ketschendorf Public School (Elementary School)]. The old building was later expanded with more classroom space with the addition of a new building.

The town had 643 inhabitants in 1910 and 686 in 1925. On July 1, 1934, Ketschendorf, with 186 hectares (460 acres) and 766 residents, was incorporated with the city of Coburg. Today Ketschendorf has the character of a suburban settlement.

Since about 1500 Ketschendorf belonged to the Evangelical Lutheran parish of Seidmannsdorf, from 1934 to Morizkirche in Coburg and since 1969 the suburb has its own church, the St. Luke Church [Lukas-Kirche].

== Public organizations ==
In Ketschendorf there are a church, a kindergarten, a youth center and a primary school (Ketschendorf Elementary School). In addition to the Klinikum Coburg branch, the youth hostel is also located in the suburb.

== Literature ==
- (de) Otto Friedrich, “900 Jahre Ketschendorf [900 Years of Ketschendorf]”, In: Fränkischer Heimatkalender 25 Jahre [Franconian Home Calendar 25 Years], 1975, p. 33
- (de) Peter Morsbach and Otto Titz, Stadt Coburg. Ensembles-Baudenkmäler-Archäologische Denkmäler [City of Coburg. Complexes-Buildings-Archaeological Monuments], Denkmäler in Bayern [Monuments in Bavaria], Volume IV, No. 48. (Munich: Karl M. Lipp Verlag, 2006), ISBN 978-3874905909
