= Großwalbur =

- Village of Meeder
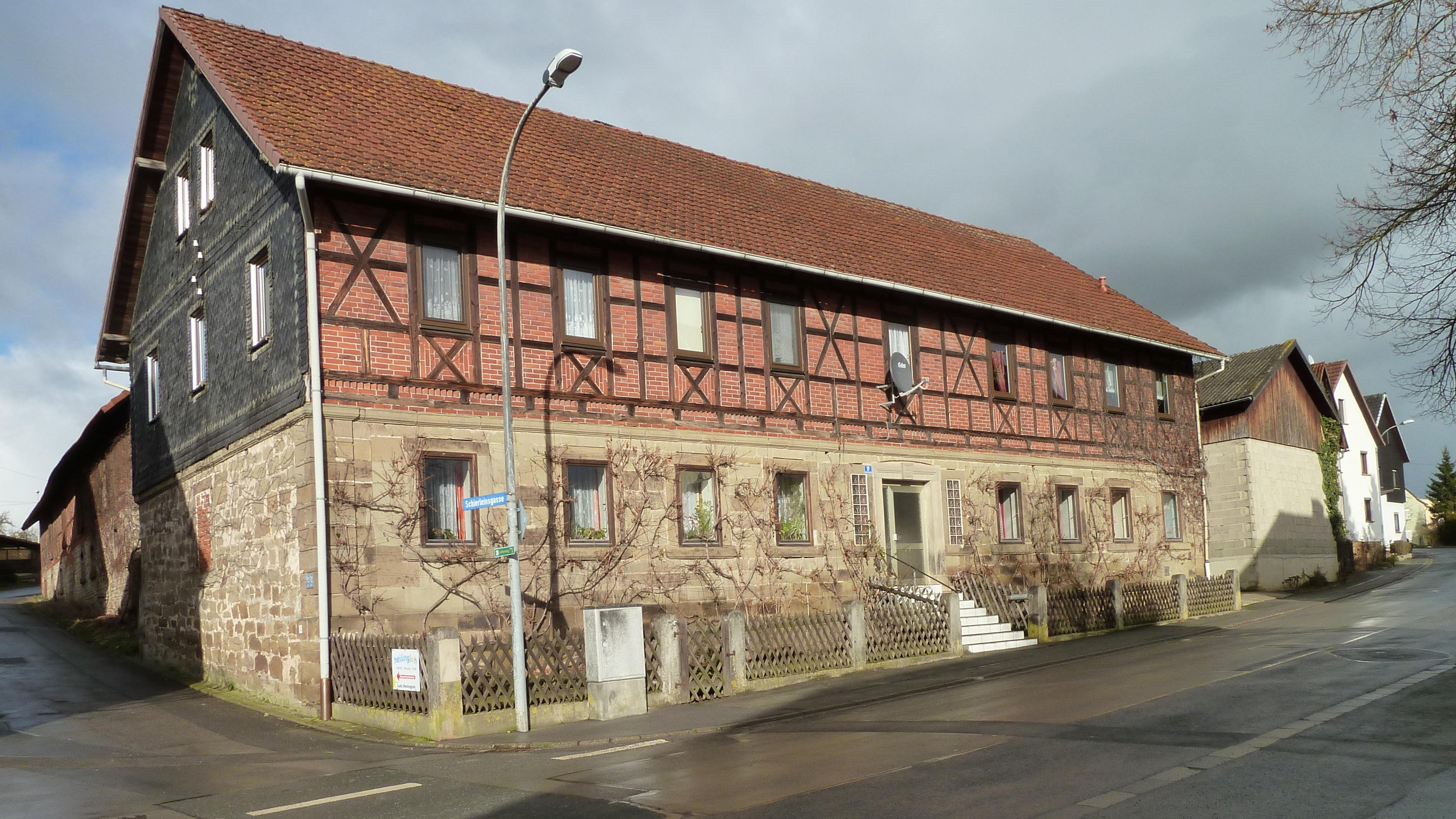
- Gutshaus Kammergut

- Coat of arms
- Interactive map of Großwalbur
- Location within Germany Location within Bavaria
- Coordinates: 50°19′48″N 10°51′9″E
- Country: Germany
- State: Bavaria
- Admin. region: Oberfranken
- District: Coburg
- Municipality: Meeder
- Elevation: 311 m (1,020 ft)

Population (2011)
  - Total: 780
- Time zone: UTC+01:00 (CET)
  - Summer (DST): UTC+02:00 (CEST)
- Postal codes: 96484
- Dialling codes: 09566, 09564
- Vehicle registration: CO

Großwalbur is a village in the municipality Meeder, district of Coburg, northern Bavaria, Germany. It is situated 16 km southeast of Hildburghausen, and 14 km northwest of Coburg.

== History ==
Großwalbur was founded in 833.

On May 1, 1978, Großwalbur became a village in the municipality Meeder.

=== Population history ===
Jahr	Einwohnerzahl
1693	326
1783	439
1864	631
1910	556
1933	593
1939	568
1970	791
2004	748
2011	780

== Culture ==
Großwalbur is locally known for its sports club 'TSV 05 Großwalbur' with its main sport activities like handball and table tennis. 'SKC Olympia Großwalbur' and 'KC Jahn' are sports clubs for bowling there. Furthermore, there are people who like running to keep in shape or attend marathon and short distance competitions. A sport fanatic guy from Großwalbur is a triathlete and took part on the Iron Man triathlon of Hawaii.

Apart from sport activities you will find cultural societies in Großwalbur like a choral society, a brass band and a citizens organisation named 'Bürgerverein Großwalbur e.V.'.

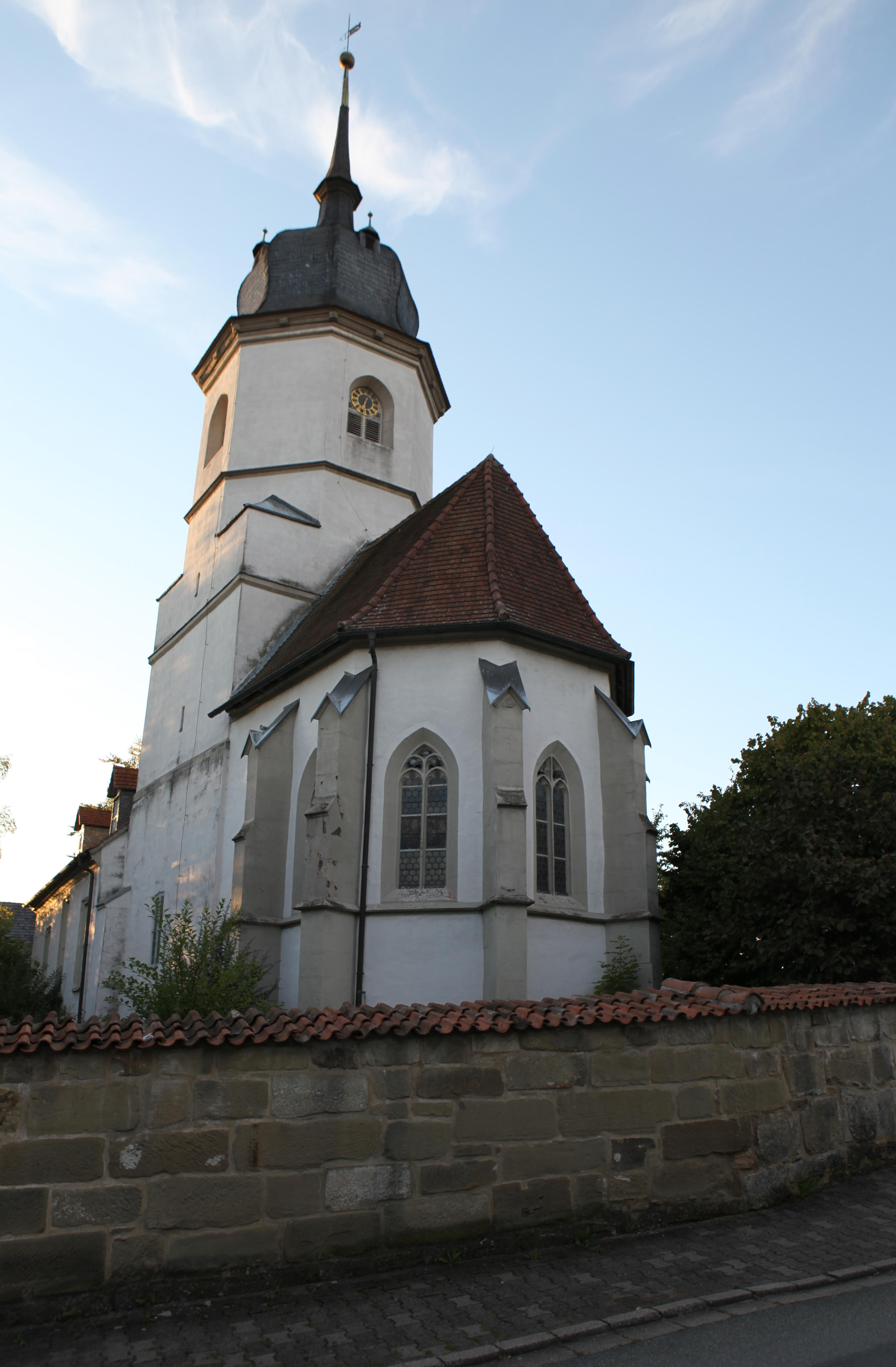
Parish church St. Oswald

The rib vault in the nave of the evangelical-Lutheran parish church St. Oswald dates from 1477. The present form with the gable roof was built in 1748. The octagonal form of the towers dates from the sixteenth century.
