= 1919 Coburg state election =

German state election

The 1919 Coburg state election was held on 9 February 1919 to elect the 11 members of the Landtag of the Free State of Coburg.

== Results ==
Graph of the party split among 11 seats.
Party	Votes	%	Seats
Independent Social Democratic Party of Germany	20,803	58.56	7
Civil Unity List	14,722	41.44	4
Total	35,525	100.00	11
Source: Schröder, Gonschior
