= Lautertal =

Lautertal may refer to the following places in Germany:

- Lautertal, Bavaria, a municipality in the district of Coburg, Bavaria
- Lautertal (Odenwald), a municipality in Bergstraße district, Hesse
- Lautertal (Vogelsberg), a municipality in Vogelsbergkreis, Hesse
