= Erik Mozzo =

United States Virgin Islands soccer player

Personal information
- Date of birth: 25 December 1990 (age 35)
- Place of birth: Saint Croix, US Virgin Islands
- Height: 1.93 m (6 ft 4 in)
- Position: Goalkeeper

Team information
- Current team: US Ivry

College career
Years	Team	Apps	(Gls)
2009	Saint Leo Lions	14	(0)
2010–2011	Clemson Tigers	1	(0)
2012–2013	Lubbock Christian Chapparrals	29	(0)

Senior career*
Years	Team	Apps	(Gls)
2012–2013	Southern West Virginia King's Warriors	23	(0)
2013–2014	Adler Weidhausen 1919		
2015–2016	Dallas City FC		
2017–2018	TSV Sonnefeld		
2018	VfL Frohnlach	1	(0)
2018–2019	FC Versailles 78	4	(0)
2019–2021	FC Chalon		
2021–2022	US Ivry		

International career^{‡}
2015–2021	US Virgin Islands	8	(0)
- * Club domestic league appearances and goals as of 18 August 2018 ‡ National team caps and goals as of 9 September 2018

Erik Mozzo (born 25 December 1990) is a US Virgin Islands soccer player who plays as a goalkeeper for the US Virgin Islands national soccer team.

== College career ==
Mozzo began his collegiate career at St. Leo University in Florida, where he appeared in 14 matches in 2009. He then transferred to Clemson. Mozzo redshirted his first year and then made only one appearance in 2011, recording 8 saves in a loss to Charlotte. Following the 2011 season, he transferred again, this time to Lubbock Christian University, where he made 29 appearances over the course of two seasons.

== Club career ==
Mozzo played for the Southern West Virginia King's Warriors of the USL PDL for the 2013 and 2014 seasons. He made 23 league appearances for the club over that time. For the 2013/14 season, he signed with German club FC Adler Weidhausen. Following the season, he left the club and returned to the United States to sign for Dallas City FC of the NPSL. In 2016, he was also a reserve goalkeeper for FC Dallas of Major League Soccer.

In 2017 Mozzo left Dallas and signed for German club TSV Sonnefeld of the Landesliga Bayern-Nordwest. In 2018 he signed for VfL Frohnlach of the Landesliga Bayern-Nordost.

Following the 2018 season Mozzo left Germany and signed for FC Versailles 78 of the French Championnat National 3. He made four league appearances during the season. In October 2019 he made the switch to another French club, FC Chalon.

== International career ==
Mozzo made his senior international debut on March 22, 2015, in a 1–0 2018 FIFA World Cup qualification match against Barbados.

=== International statistics ===
As of match played March 21, 2021

National team	Year	Apps	Goals
United States Virgin Islands	2015	2	0
United States Virgin Islands	2016	4	0
United States Virgin Islands	2017	0	0
United States Virgin Islands	2018	1	0
United States Virgin Islands	2019	0	0
United States Virgin Islands	2020	0	0
United States Virgin Islands	2021	1	0
Total		8	0
