= Grub am Forst (Verwaltungsgemeinschaft) =

- Verwaltungsgemeinschaft
- Location of Grub am Forst within Coburg district
- Interactive map of Grub am Forst
- Location within Germany Location within Bavaria
- Coordinates: 50°13′N 11°01′E
- Country: Germany
- State: Bavaria
- Admin. region: Upper Franconia
- District: Coburg
- Seat: Grub am Forst
- Subdivisions: 2 municipalities

Area
  - Total: 14.56 km^{2} (5.62 sq mi)

Population (2025-12-31)
  - Total: 3,960
  - Density: 272/km^{2} (704/sq mi)
- Time zone: UTC+01:00 (CET)
  - Summer (DST): UTC+02:00 (CEST)
- Website: www.grub-am-forst.de

Grub am Forst is a Verwaltungsgemeinschaft (municipal association) in the district of Coburg in Bavaria, Germany. Its seat is in Grub am Forst.

It consists of the following municipalities:

1. Grub am Forst
2. Niederfüllbach
