= Lauter (Itz) =

River of Bavaria, Germany

- The Lauter in the municipality Lauter

Location
- Country: Germany
- State: Bavaria

Physical characteristics
- Mouth
  - location: Itz
  - coordinates: 50.2650°N 10.9639°E
- Length: 17.7 km (11.0 mi)

Basin features
- Progression: Itz→ Main→ Rhine→ North Sea

Lauter (German pronunciation: [ˈlaʊtɐ]) is a river of Bavaria, Germany. It is a right tributary of the Itz in Coburg.

== Geography ==
=== Course of the river ===
The Lauter emerges in the municipality of Lautertal in the district of Tremersdorf due to the confluence of the right Rottenbach and the left Weihergraben, which is somewhat more important in terms of both length and sub-catchment area. Generally, the river flows in a southerly direction through Neukirchen and Tiefenlauter to Oberlauter. Here it is reinforced by several Karstquellen, the spring ponds of the Lauter. In its further course, the Lauter runs through the towns of Unterlauter, Bertelsdorf and Neuses. In the centre of Coburg, it joins the Itz at the Heilig-Kreuz-Kirche (Church of the Holy Cross).

Since the end of 2012, a gravity tunnel located near Oberlauter has been transferring the flood flows of the Lauter that exceed 4 m³/s to the Goldbergsee retention basin in the course of the large lower reaches tributary Sulzbach.

=== Tributaries ===
- Rottenbach (right spring stream)
- Weihergraben (left spring stream)
- Weisbach
- Ortelsgraben
- Maasgraben
- Flöchgraben
- Beigraben
- Sulzbach
- Kürengrundbach
- Rottenbach

=== Spring ponds of the Lauter ===
The source ponds of the Lauter are located between Tiefenlauter and Oberlauter in the private grounds of a former fish farm. They are used as water supply for the ponds. The Karstquellen from the middle shell limestone have a depth of up to two metres and pour out an average of 420 litres per second. After heavy rainfall events, the spring water has a brownish colour. The spring ponds are designated by the Bavarian State Office for the Environment as Geotope 473Q001.

== See also ==
- List of rivers of Bavaria
