= Weitramsdorf =

- Municipality
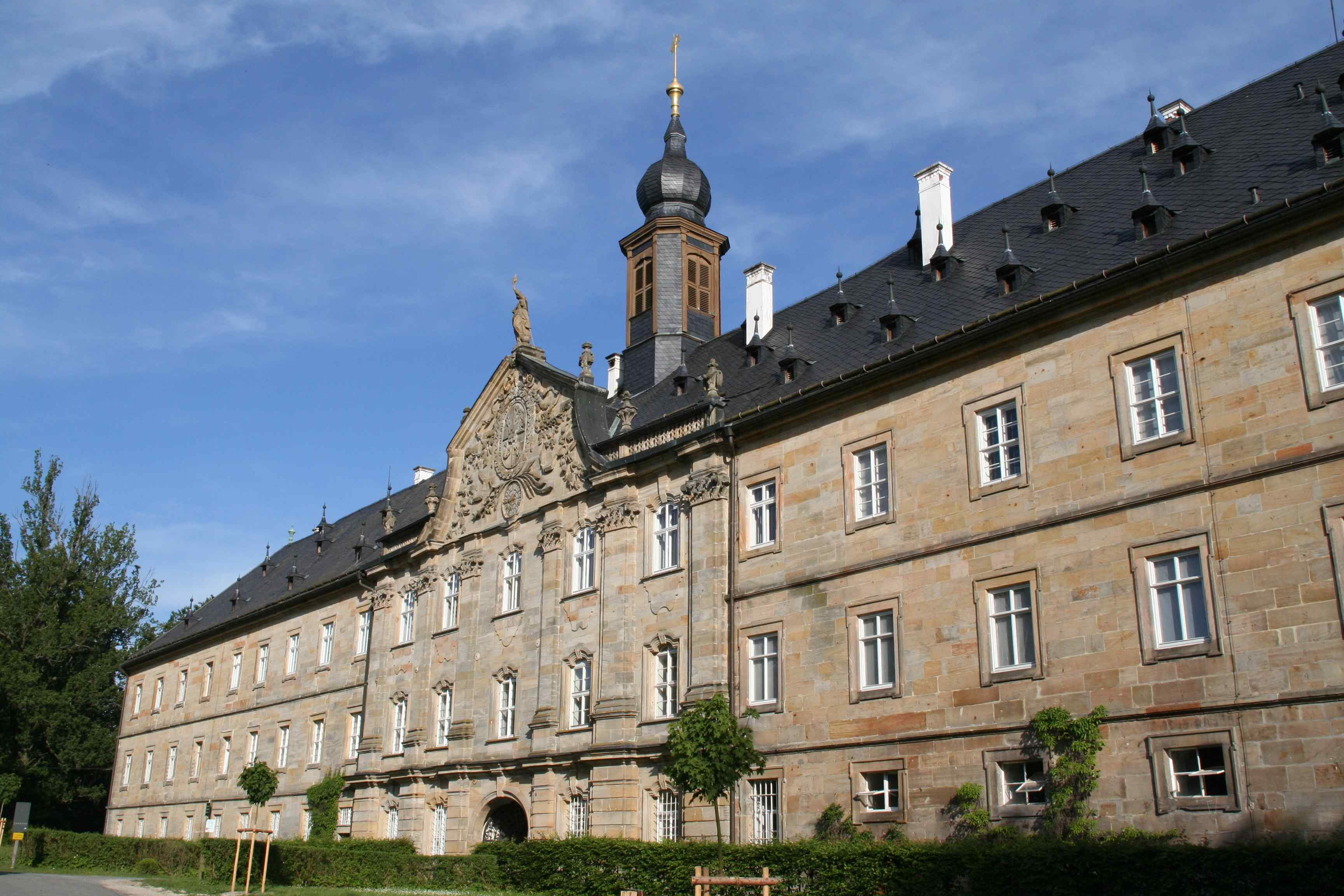
- Tambach Castle

- Coat of arms

- Location of Weitramsdorf within Coburg district
- Interactive map of Weitramsdorf
- Location within Germany Location within Bavaria
- Coordinates: 50°15′N 10°52′E
- Country: Germany
- State: Bavaria
- Admin. region: Oberfranken
- District: Coburg
- Subdivisions: 9 Ortsteile

Government
  - Mayor (2024–30): Hans Steinfelder (CSU)

Area
  - Total: 33.71 km^{2} (13.02 sq mi)
- Elevation: 300 m (980 ft)

Population (2025-12-31)
  - Total: 4,999
  - Density: 148.3/km^{2} (384.1/sq mi)
- Time zone: UTC+01:00 (CET)
  - Summer (DST): UTC+02:00 (CEST)
- Postal codes: 96479
- Dialling codes: 09561
- Vehicle registration: CO
- Website: www.weitramsdorf.de

Weitramsdorf is a municipality in the district of Coburg in Bavaria in Germany. It consists of the following villages: Weitramsdorf, Gersbach, Schlettach, Altenhof, Hergramsdorf, Tambach, Neundorf, Weidach and Weidach-Vogelherd.

The castle (and former monastery) of Tambach has been owned by the counts of Ortenburg since 1806.
