= Lautertal, Bavaria =

Lautertal
- Municipality
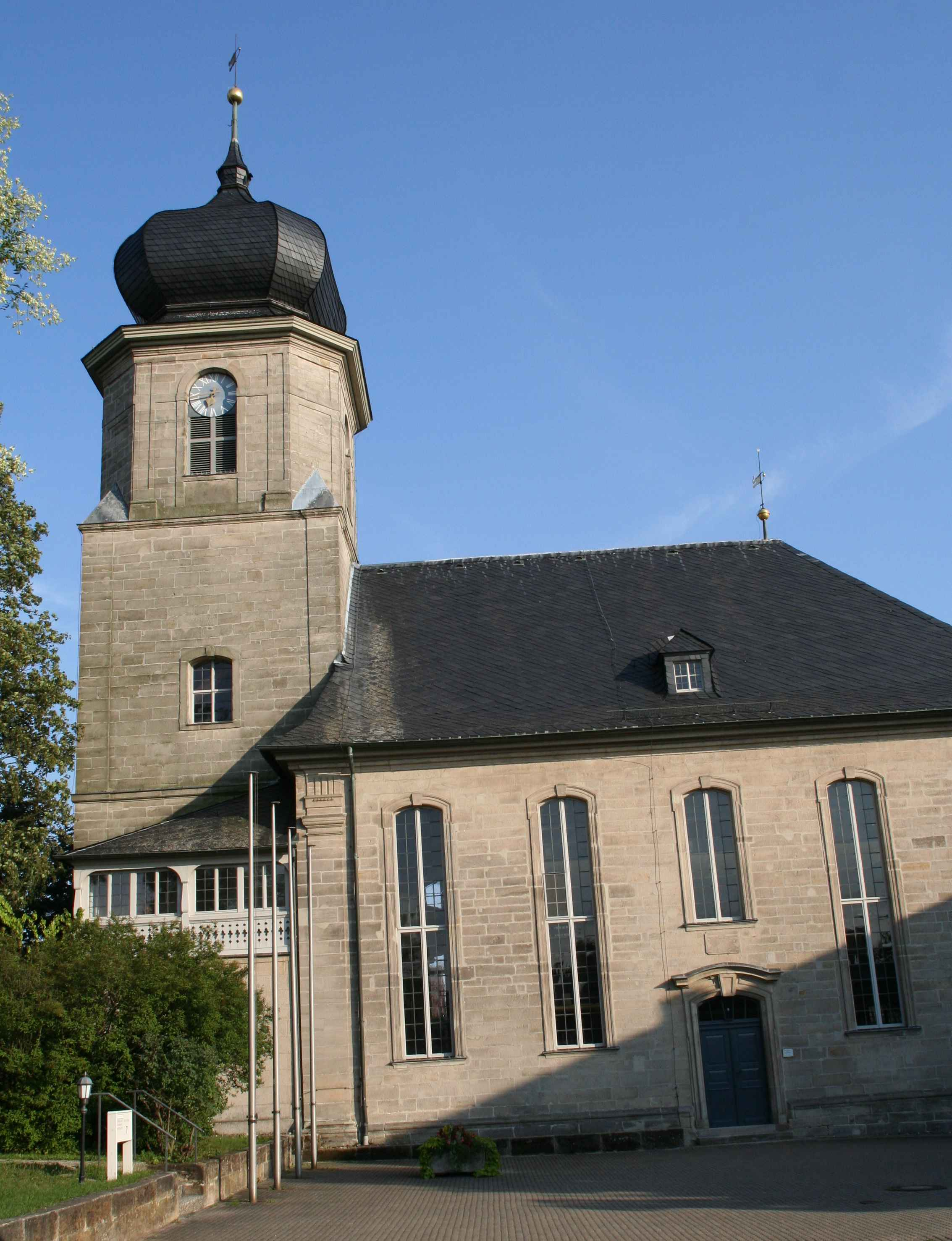
- Protestant church

- Coat of arms

- Location of Lautertal within Coburg district
- Interactive map of Lautertal
- Location within Germany Location within Bavaria
- Coordinates: 50°20′N 10°58′E
- Country: Germany
- State: Bavaria
- Admin. region: Oberfranken
- District: Coburg

Government
  - Mayor (2019–25): Karl Kolb

Area
  - Total: 30.35 km^{2} (11.72 sq mi)
- Elevation: 300–527 m (984–1,729 ft)

Population (2025-12-31)
  - Total: 4,333
  - Density: 142.8/km^{2} (369.8/sq mi)
- Time zone: UTC+01:00 (CET)
  - Summer (DST): UTC+02:00 (CEST)
- Postal codes: 96486
- Dialling codes: 09561, 09566
- Vehicle registration: CO, NEC
- Website: www.gemeindelautertal.de

Lautertal (German pronunciation: [ˈlaʊtɐtaːl], lit. 'Lauter Valley') is a municipality in the district of Coburg in Bavaria in Germany. Near Lautertal, there was between 1952 and 1992 a DECCA-transmitter.

== Geography ==
Lautertal is in the north of the district of Coburg between the state of Thuringia and Coburg. The municipality consists of the six villages Unterlauter, Oberlauter, Tiefenlauter, Neukirchen, Tremersdorf and Rottenbach. The Buchberg (close to Rottenbach) is the highest elevation in the district.

== Climate ==
Climate data for Lautertal (1991–2020 normals)
Month	Jan	Feb	Mar	Apr	May	Jun	Jul	Aug	Sep	Oct	Nov	Dec	Year
Mean daily maximum °C (°F)	2.6 (36.7)	4.3 (39.7)	9.0 (48.2)	14.6 (58.3)	18.8 (65.8)	22.2 (72.0)	24.4 (75.9)	24.4 (75.9)	19.1 (66.4)	13.3 (55.9)	6.8 (44.2)	3.4 (38.1)	13.6 (56.5)
Daily mean °C (°F)	0.1 (32.2)	0.8 (33.4)	4.4 (39.9)	9.1 (48.4)	13.3 (55.9)	16.5 (61.7)	18.5 (65.3)	18.1 (64.6)	13.7 (56.7)	9.0 (48.2)	4.2 (39.6)	1.0 (33.8)	9.1 (48.4)
Mean daily minimum °C (°F)	−2.5 (27.5)	−2.4 (27.7)	0.3 (32.5)	3.5 (38.3)	7.5 (45.5)	10.6 (51.1)	12.6 (54.7)	12.4 (54.3)	8.8 (47.8)	5.3 (41.5)	1.5 (34.7)	−1.3 (29.7)	4.7 (40.5)
Average precipitation mm (inches)	57.0 (2.24)	44.2 (1.74)	45.4 (1.79)	39.4 (1.55)	65.2 (2.57)	66.5 (2.62)	84.9 (3.34)	57.9 (2.28)	57.2 (2.25)	50.4 (1.98)	55.7 (2.19)	65.7 (2.59)	681.0 (26.81)
Average precipitation days (≥ 1.0 mm)	17.6	15.5	14.9	13.0	13.4	13.8	15.2	13.2	12.3	14.9	16.4	19.0	179.6
Average relative humidity (%)	85.1	81.4	75.6	68.7	69.5	70.4	70.7	69.7	77.1	83.1	87.0	87.2	77.1
Mean monthly sunshine hours	47.3	71.1	121.5	180.4	205.7	211.4	220.8	208.9	150.5	102.4	44.6	37.4	1,594.3
Source: World Meteorological Organization

== Infrastructure ==
=== Car ===
Lautertal has two junctions to Bundesautobahn 73 motorway in the north and south. The former route of the Bundesstraße 4 is the longest main road of the village.

=== Rail Transport ===
The Eisenach-Lichtenfels railway line, also known as the Werra Valley Railway, ran through Lautertal until the 1970s. There was a train station in Tiefenlauter. Due to the fact that Thuringia belonged to the GDR, the train traffic was separated, later the route had to be abandoned. A reactivation is demanded by many, however the municipality is against it.

=== Public Transport ===
Oberlauter and Unterlauter are connected to Coburg by city bus line 2. The additional line 8318 connects all the other villages with Coburg.
