= Dörfles-Esbach =

- Municipality
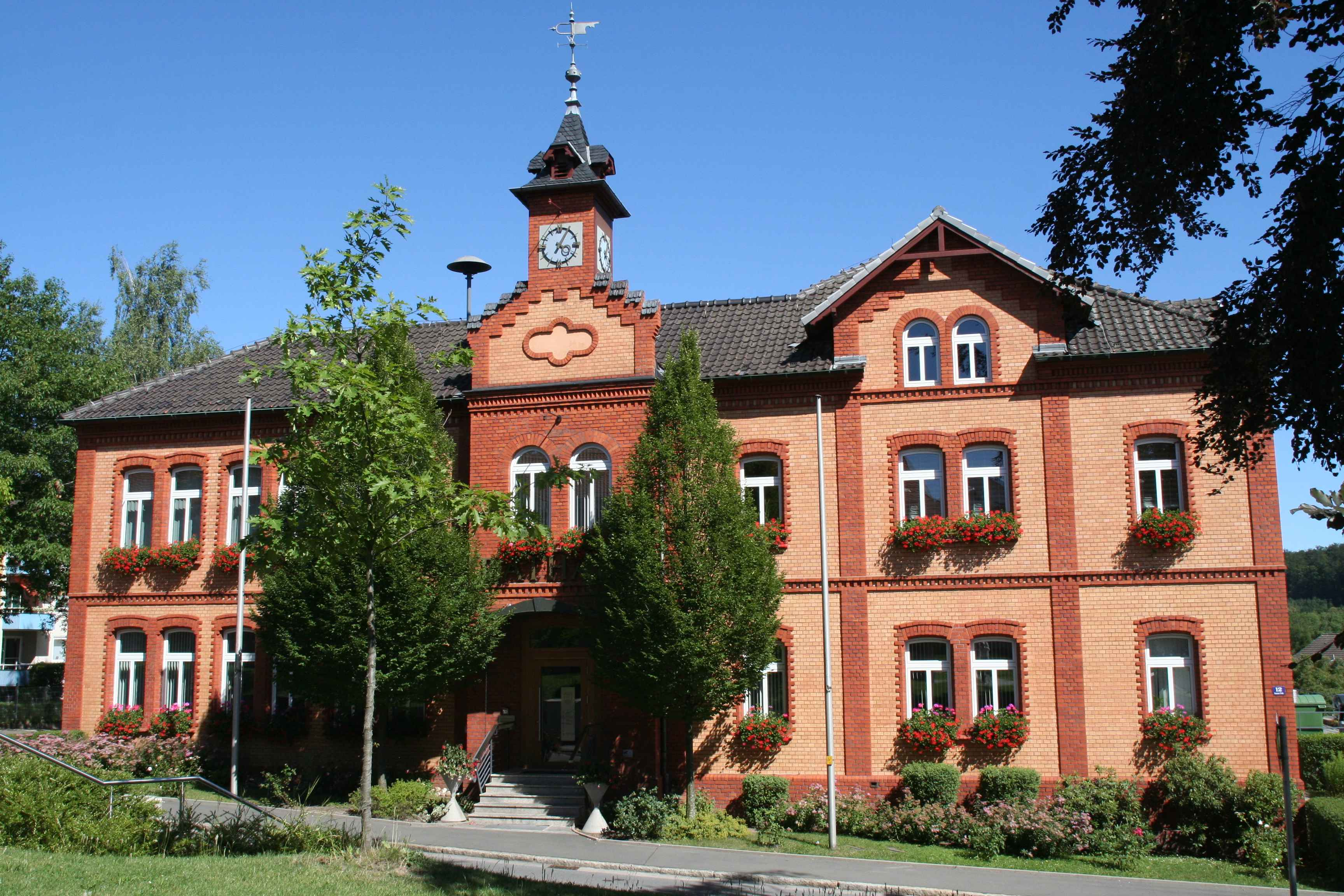
- Town hall

- Coat of arms

- Location of Dörfles-Esbach within Coburg district
- Interactive map of Dörfles-Esbach
- Location within Germany Location within Bavaria
- Coordinates: 50°16′50″N 10°59′37″E
- Country: Germany
- State: Bavaria
- Admin. region: Oberfranken
- District: Coburg
- Subdivisions: 2 Ortsteile

Government
  - Mayor (2022–28): Torsten Dohnalek

Area
  - Total: 3.83 km^{2} (1.48 sq mi)
- Elevation: 306 m (1,004 ft)

Population (2025-12-31)
  - Total: 3,535
  - Density: 923/km^{2} (2,390/sq mi)
- Time zone: UTC+01:00 (CET)
  - Summer (DST): UTC+02:00 (CEST)
- Postal codes: 96487
- Dialling codes: 09561
- Vehicle registration: CO
- Website: www.doerfles-esbach.de

Dörfles-Esbach is a municipality in the district of Coburg in Bavaria in Germany.
