= Coburg (district) =

Coordinates: 50°16′N 10°55′E

- District
- Flag Coat of arms
- Country: Germany
- State: Bavaria
- Adm. region: Upper Franconia
- Capital: Coburg

Government
  - District admin.: Sebastian Straubel (CSU)

Area
  - Total: 592 km^{2} (229 sq mi)

Population (31 December 2025)
  - Total: 83,687
  - Density: 141/km^{2} (366/sq mi)
- Time zone: UTC+01:00 (CET)
  - Summer (DST): UTC+02:00 (CEST)
- Vehicle registration: CO, NEC
- Website: landkreis-coburg.de

Coburg (German pronunciation: [ˈkoːbʊʁk]) is a Landkreis (district) in Bavaria, Germany. It is bounded by (from the east and clockwise) the districts of Kronach, Lichtenfels, Bamberg and Haßberge, and by the state of Thuringia (districts Hildburghausen and Sonneberg). The district surrounds, but does not include the city of Coburg.

== History ==
The city of Coburg has largely influenced the history of the district. From 1826 to 1918, the region was part of the small duchy of Saxe-Coburg-Gotha (see Thuringia). In a referendum from 1919, the Coburg portion of this state decided to join Bavaria (united in 1920). The present district is identical to that portion but excludes Coburg and the exclave of Königsberg, which is part of Haßberge district. The city of Neustadt was a district-free city until 1972 and was then incorporated into the district.

== Geography ==
The district is located in the hilly country between the Thuringian Slate Mountains and the Main valley.

== Economy ==
In 2017 (latest data available) the GDP per inhabitant was €27,145. This places the district 89th out of 96 districts (rural and urban) in Bavaria (overall average: €46,698).

== Coat of arms ==
The arms consist of the blue and white checkered pattern of Bavaria and the arms of the Wettin dynasty of Saxony. These arms represent the historic affiliations to both states.

== Towns and municipalities ==
Clickable map of towns and municipalities in the district

Towns
1. Bad Rodach
2. Neustadt bei Coburg
3. Rödental
4. Seßlach
Municipalities
1. Ahorn
2. Dörfles-Esbach
3. Ebersdorf bei Coburg
4. Großheirath
5. Itzgrund
6. Lautertal

7. Meeder
8. Sonnefeld
9. Untersiemau
10. Weidhausen
11. Weitramsdorf

Verwaltungsgemeinschaften

1. Grub am Forst

1. Grub am Forst^{1}
2. Niederfüllbach
^{1}seat of the Verwaltungsgemeinschaft
