= Meeder =

- Municipality
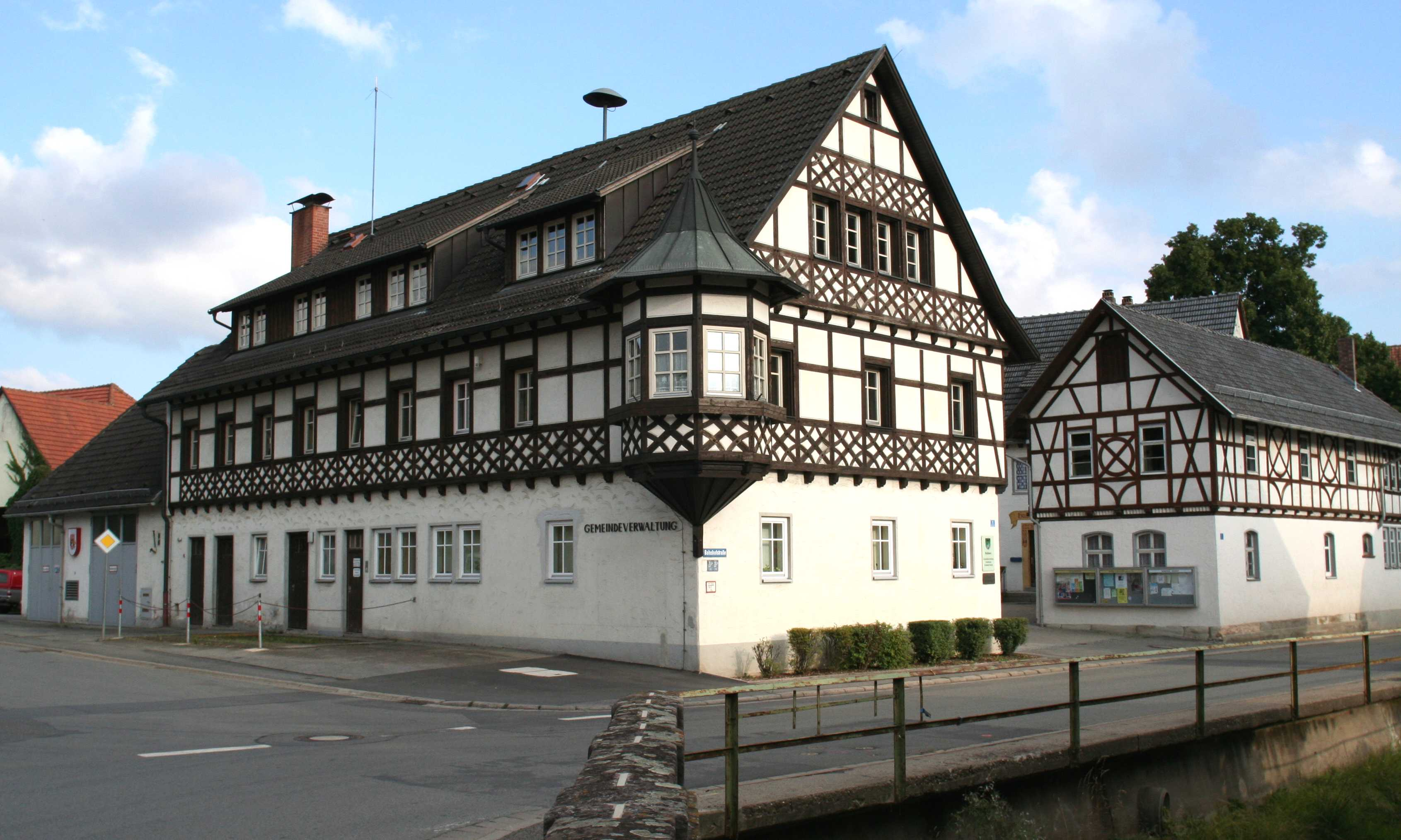
- Town hall

- Coat of arms

- Location of Meeder within Coburg district
- Interactive map of Meeder
- Location within Germany Location within Bavaria
- Coordinates: 50°19′18″N 10°54′21″E
- Country: Germany
- State: Bavaria
- Admin. region: Oberfranken
- District: Coburg
- Subdivisions: 15 Ortsteile

Government
  - Mayor (2020–26): Bernd Höfer (CSU)

Area
  - Total: 73.58 km^{2} (28.41 sq mi)
- Elevation: 326 m (1,070 ft)

Population (2025-12-31)
  - Total: 3,447
  - Density: 46.85/km^{2} (121.3/sq mi)
- Time zone: UTC+01:00 (CET)
  - Summer (DST): UTC+02:00 (CEST)
- Postal codes: 96484
- Dialling codes: 09566
- Vehicle registration: CO
- Website: www.gemeinde-meeder.de

Meeder (German pronunciation: [ˈmeːdɐ]) is a municipality in the district of Coburg in Bavaria in Germany.
