= Weidhausen =

Weidhausen b. Coburg
- Municipality
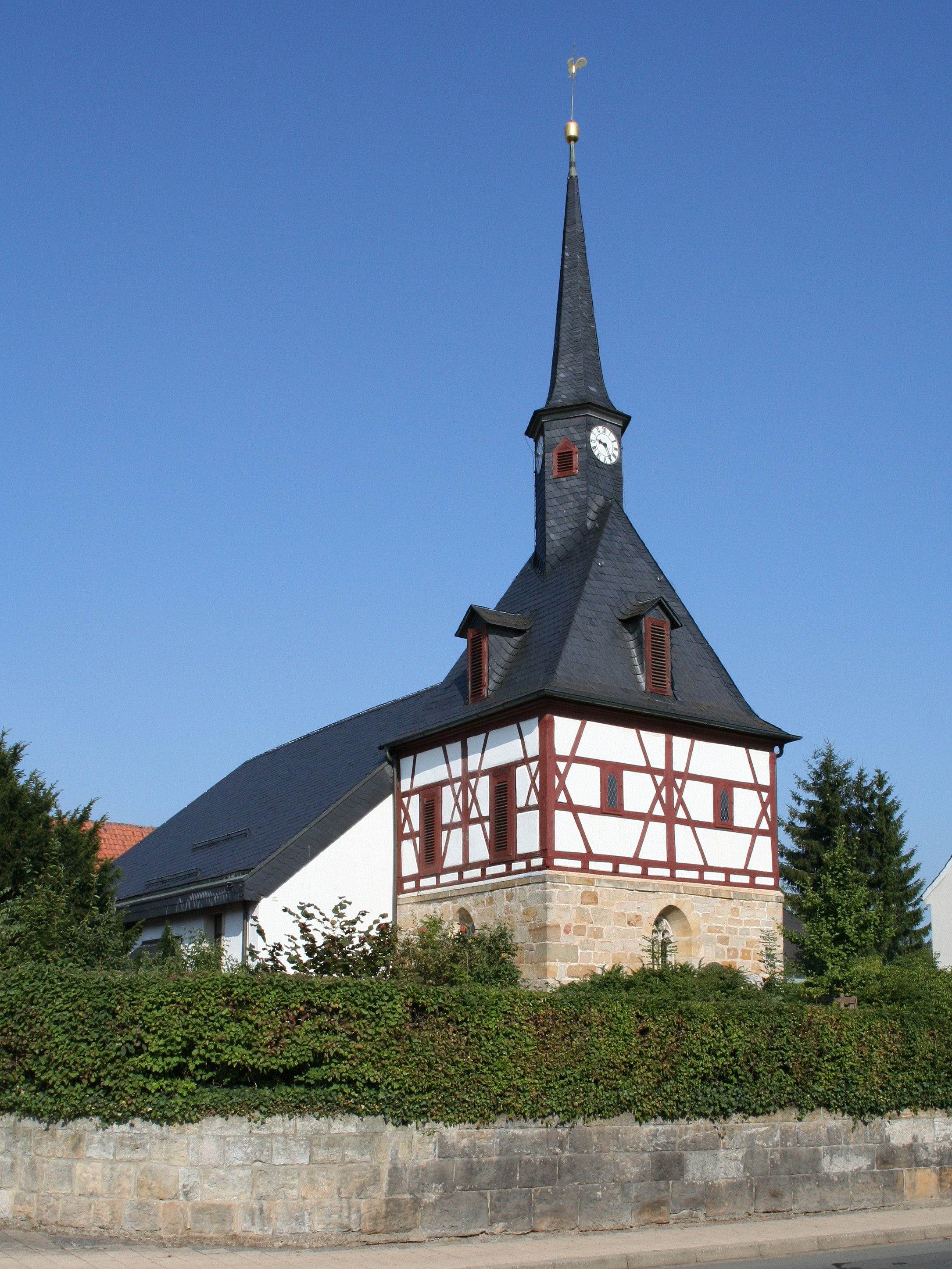
- Protestant church

- Coat of arms

- Location of Weidhausen b. Coburg within Coburg district
- Interactive map of Weidhausen b. Coburg
- Location within Germany Location within Bavaria
- Coordinates: 50°12′N 11°7′E
- Country: Germany
- State: Bavaria
- Admin. region: Oberfranken
- District: Coburg
- Subdivisions: 3 Ortsteile

Government
  - Mayor (2020–26): Markus Mönch (Ind.)

Area
  - Total: 9.61 km^{2} (3.71 sq mi)
- Elevation: 308 m (1,010 ft)

Population (2025-12-31)
  - Total: 3,113
  - Density: 324/km^{2} (839/sq mi)
- Time zone: UTC+01:00 (CET)
  - Summer (DST): UTC+02:00 (CEST)
- Postal codes: 96279
- Dialling codes: 09562
- Vehicle registration: CO
- Website: www.weidhausen.de

Weidhausen bei Coburg (German pronunciation: [vaɪtˈhaʊzn̩ baɪ ˈkoːbʊʁk], lit. 'Weidhausen near Coburg', officially: Weidhausen b. Coburg) is a municipality in the southeastern portion of the Coburg district of Bavaria in Germany.

== Geography ==
=== City districts ===
The municipality is divided into three districts:

- Weidhausen
- Neuensorg
- Trübenbach

== History and coat of arms ==
The first documented mentions were Neuensorg in 1195, Trübenbach in 1289 and Weidhausen in 1225.

Weidhausen was initially part of the Kloster monastery, later the Coburg principality, and then Bavaria in 1920.

A manor was acquired by Georg von Erffa in Weidhausen in 1651. The two eagle wings in Weidhausen's coat of arms came from the crest of this family.

The district of Trübenbach is represented in the coat of arms through the stream (using the 'bach' portion of its name, meaning 'stream' in German) with waves.

The district of Neuensorg, whose residents were employed in forestry, were symbolized through the inclusion of wood cutting tools, the felling axe and the adze.

The colors of gold and blue refer to the colors of Baron von Erffa. The colors of silver and red commemorate the membership of the community to the bishopric of Bamberg.
