= Großheirath =

- Municipality
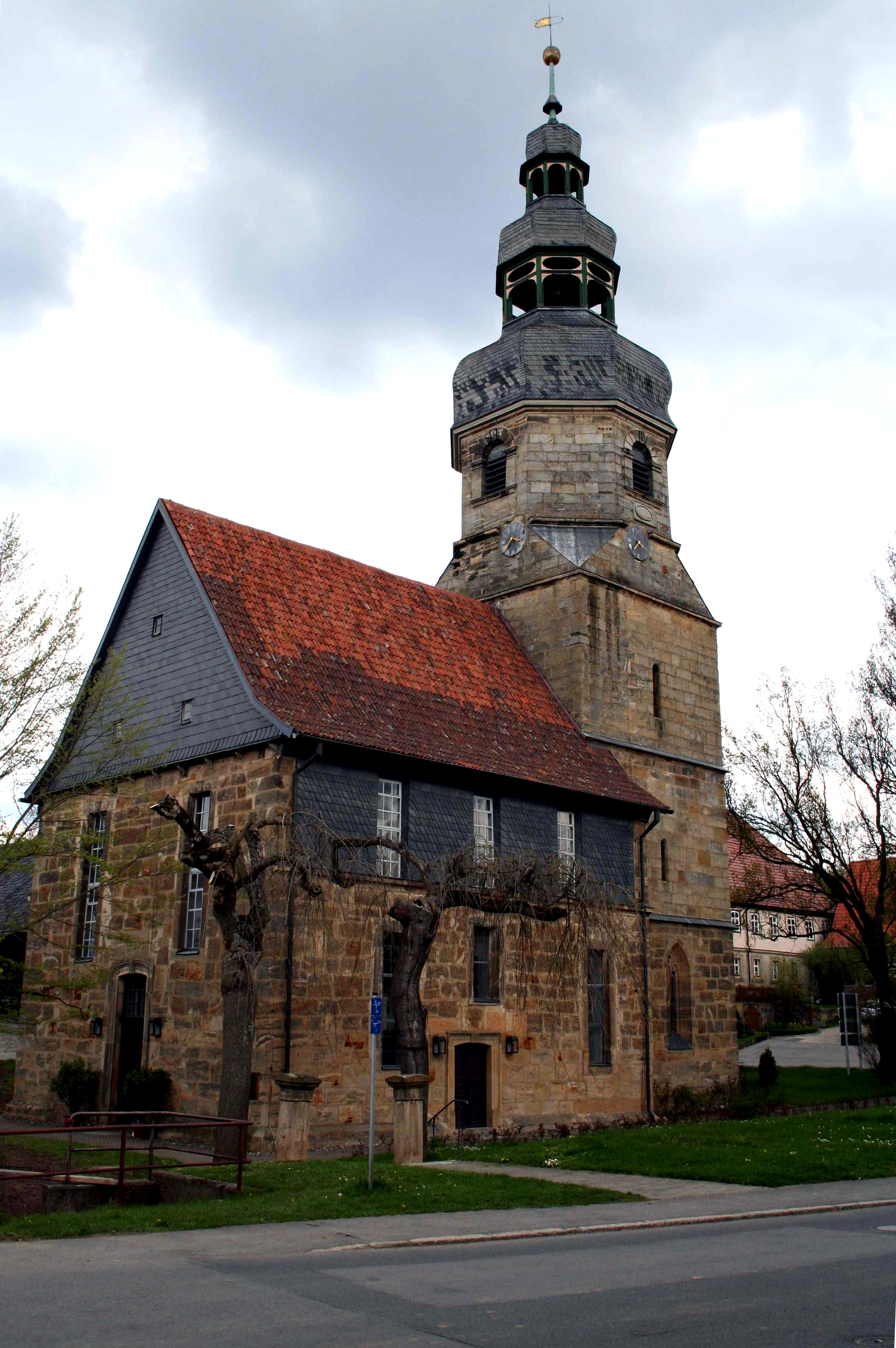
- Church

- Coat of arms

- Location of Großheirath within Coburg district
- Interactive map of Großheirath
- Location within Germany Location within Bavaria
- Coordinates: 50°10′33″N 10°57′02″E
- Country: Germany
- State: Bavaria
- Admin. region: Oberfranken
- District: Coburg
- Subdivisions: 6 Ortsteile

Government
  - Mayor (2020–26): Udo Siegel (CSU)

Area
  - Total: 22.27 km^{2} (8.60 sq mi)
- Elevation: 303 m (994 ft)

Population (2025-12-31)
  - Total: 2,541
  - Density: 114.1/km^{2} (295.5/sq mi)
- Time zone: UTC+01:00 (CET)
  - Summer (DST): UTC+02:00 (CEST)
- Postal codes: 96269
- Dialling codes: 09565
- Vehicle registration: CO
- Website: www.grossheirath.de

Großheirath is a municipality in the district of Coburg in Bavaria in Germany.
