= Ahorn, Bavaria =

Ahorn
- Municipality
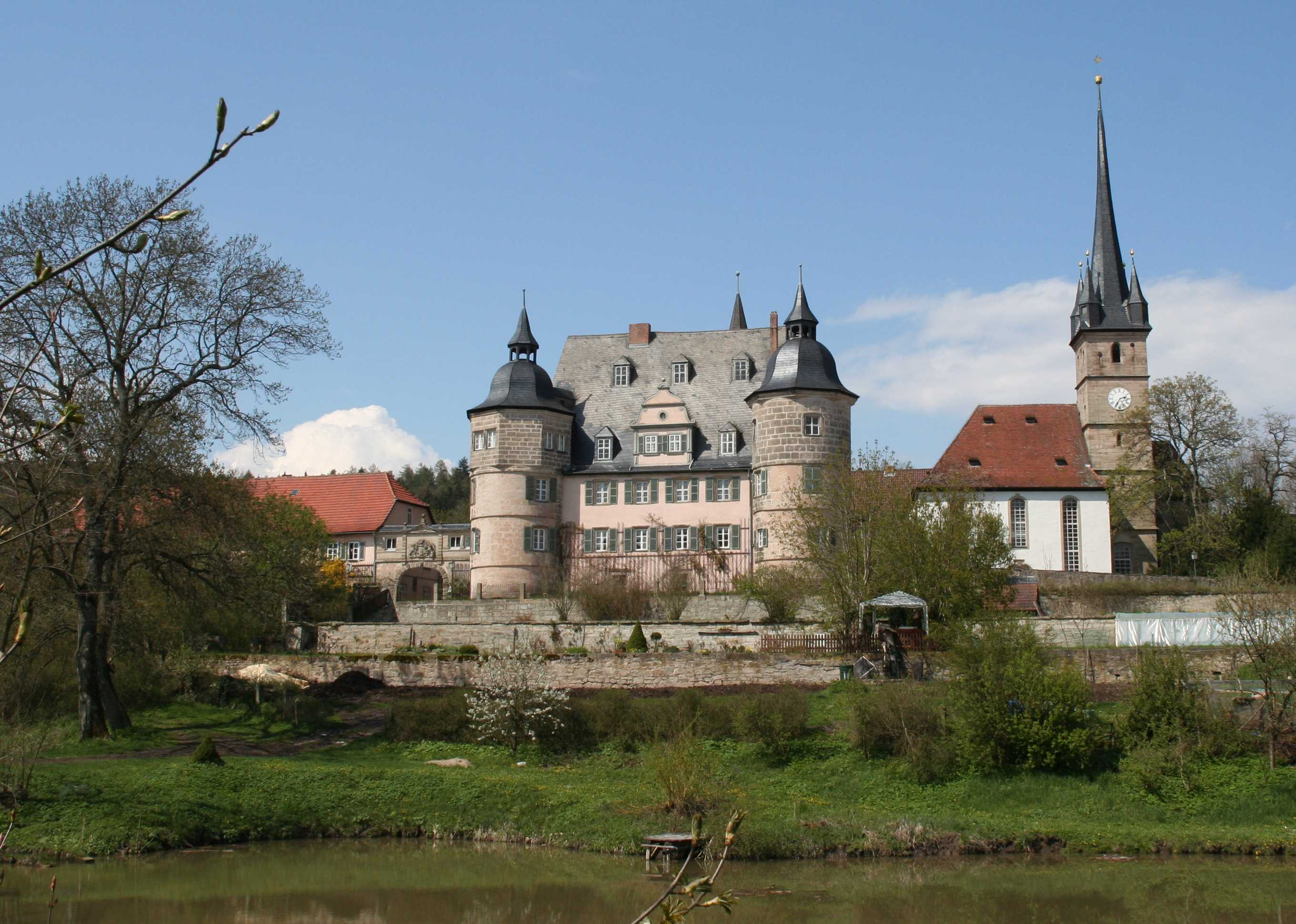
- Ahorn Castle

- Coat of arms

- Location of Ahorn within Coburg district
- Interactive map of Ahorn
- Location within Germany Location within Bavaria
- Coordinates: 50°14′N 10°57′E
- Country: Germany
- State: Bavaria
- Admin. region: Oberfranken
- District: Coburg
- Subdivisions: 12 Gemeindeteile

Government
  - Mayor (2020–26): Martin Finzel (Ind.)

Area
  - Total: 19.83 km^{2} (7.66 sq mi)
- Elevation: 330 m (1,080 ft)

Population (2025-12-31)
  - Total: 4,003
  - Density: 201.9/km^{2} (522.8/sq mi)
- Time zone: UTC+01:00 (CET)
  - Summer (DST): UTC+02:00 (CEST)
- Postal codes: 96482
- Dialling codes: 09561, 09565
- Vehicle registration: CO
- Website: www.ahorn.de

Ahorn (German pronunciation: [ˈaːhɔʁn]) is a municipality in the district of Coburg in Bavaria in Germany.

== History ==
Ahorn was first mentioned in 1074/75 as "clearing farms in the forests of Ahorny Castle". The development of the settlement is closely related to the history of Ahorn castle, which was built in 1555 by Joachim von Rosenau after the German Peasants' War (1524–1526) on the remains of an older castle in the Renaissance style. Since the early 1820s, Ahorn castle is owned and inhabited by a branch of the Franco-Thuringian von Erffa family.

Within the German Empire (1871-1918), Ahorn was part of the Duchy of Saxe-Coburg and Gotha and become - after World War I - part of the newly founded Free State of Bavaria in 1919.

== Coat of Arms ==
The blazon shows a maple leaf (Ahorn = maple) and Ahorn castle as the symbol for the community. The colors green and silver of maple leaf and castle indicate the affiliation of the municipality to the former Wettin Duchy of Saxe-Coburg and Gotha. Maple leaf and castle are embedded in the colors gold and blue from the coat of arms of the family of the barons of Erffa.
