= Grub am Forst =

Grub a.Forst
- Municipality
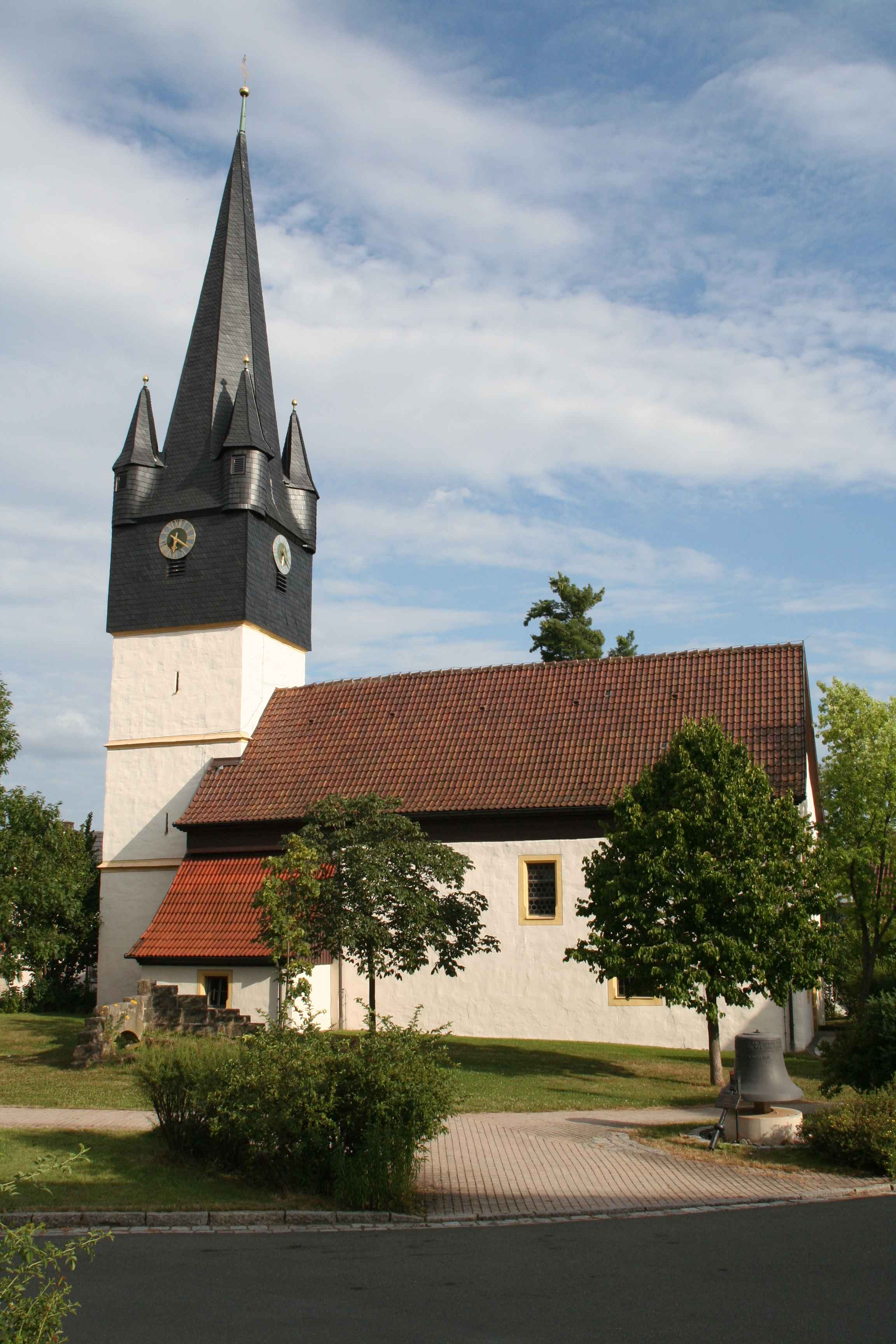
- Protestant church

- Coat of arms

- Location of Grub a.Forst within Coburg district
- Interactive map of Grub a.Forst
- Location within Germany Location within Bavaria
- Coordinates: 50°13′N 11°1′E
- Country: Germany
- State: Bavaria
- Admin. region: Oberfranken
- District: Coburg
- Municipal assoc.: Grub am Forst
- Subdivisions: 6 Ortsteile

Government
  - Mayor (2020–26): Jürgen Wittmann

Area
  - Total: 11.97 km^{2} (4.62 sq mi)
- Elevation: 300 m (980 ft)

Population (2025-12-31)
  - Total: 2,510
  - Density: 210/km^{2} (543/sq mi)
- Time zone: UTC+01:00 (CET)
  - Summer (DST): UTC+02:00 (CEST)
- Postal codes: 96271
- Dialling codes: 09560
- Vehicle registration: CO
- Website: www.grub-am-forst.de

Grub am Forst is a municipality in the district of Coburg in Bavaria in Germany. It has ca 3,100 residents. The nearest large town is Coburg. The following villages are part of it:

- Buscheller
- Forsthub
- Rohrbach
- Roth am Forst
- Zeickhorn

The municipality's political parties are the CSU, SPD, the Freie Wähler and the Wählervereinigung Gut für Grub.

The coat of arms shows a pinophyta in a valley between two hills. It describes the location of Grub am Forst: a village between two hills (Grub/Grube) which is located near to a forest (Forst/Wald).
