= Niederfüllbach =

- Municipality
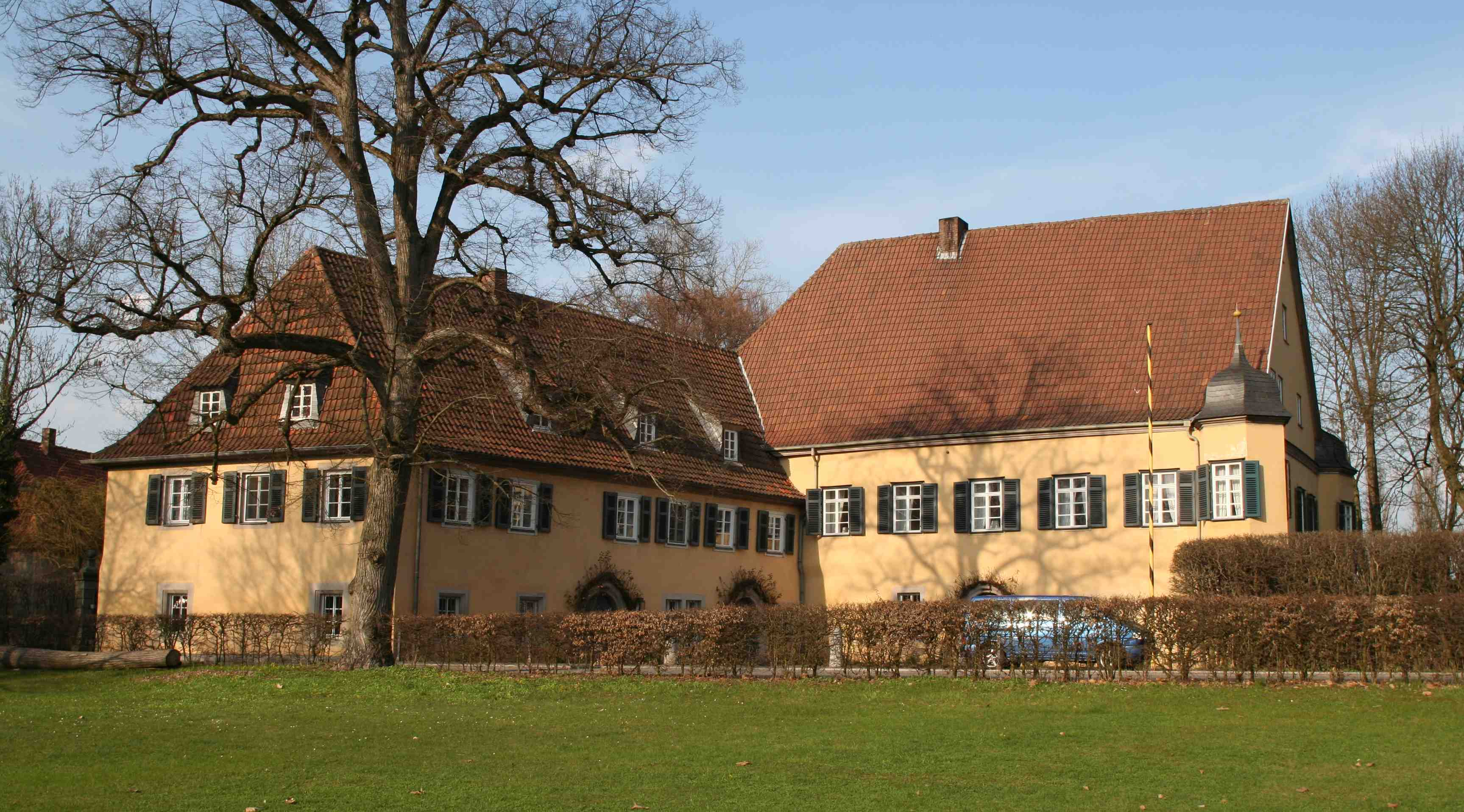
- Niederfüllbach Castle

- Coat of arms

- Location of Niederfüllbach within Coburg district
- Interactive map of Niederfüllbach
- Location within Germany Location within Bavaria
- Coordinates: 50°13′12″N 10°59′31″E
- Country: Germany
- State: Bavaria
- Admin. region: Oberfranken
- District: Coburg
- Municipal assoc.: Grub am Forst

Government
  - Mayor (2020–26): Bastian Büttner (CSU)

Area
  - Total: 2.59 km^{2} (1.00 sq mi)
- Elevation: 280–350 m (920–1,150 ft)

Population (2025-12-31)
  - Total: 1,450
  - Density: 560/km^{2} (1,450/sq mi)
- Time zone: UTC+01:00 (CET)
  - Summer (DST): UTC+02:00 (CEST)
- Postal codes: 96489
- Dialling codes: 09565
- Vehicle registration: CO
- Website: www.niederfuellbach.de

Niederfüllbach is a municipality in the district of Coburg in Bavaria in Germany.

== Gallery ==
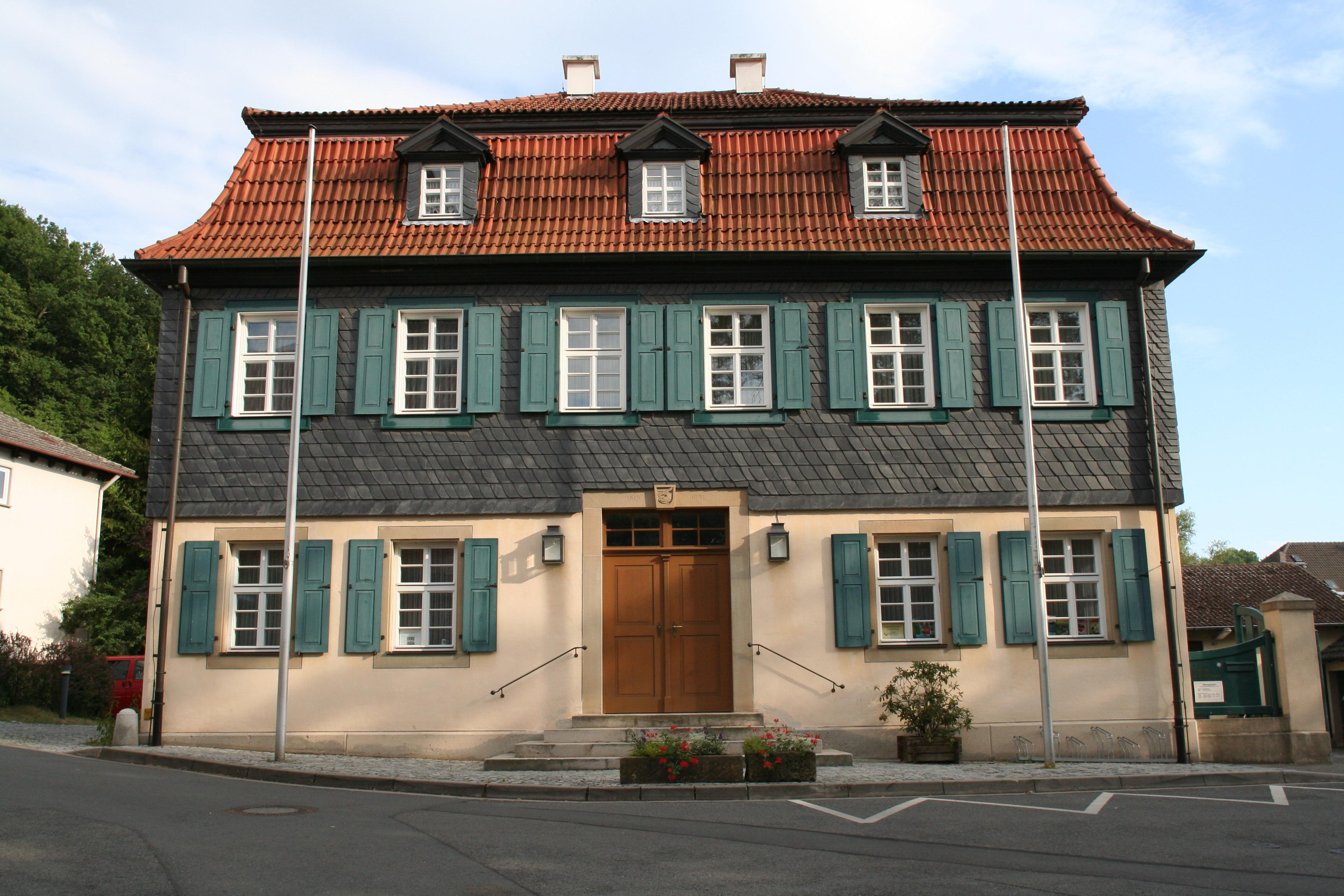
Townhall of Niederfülbach

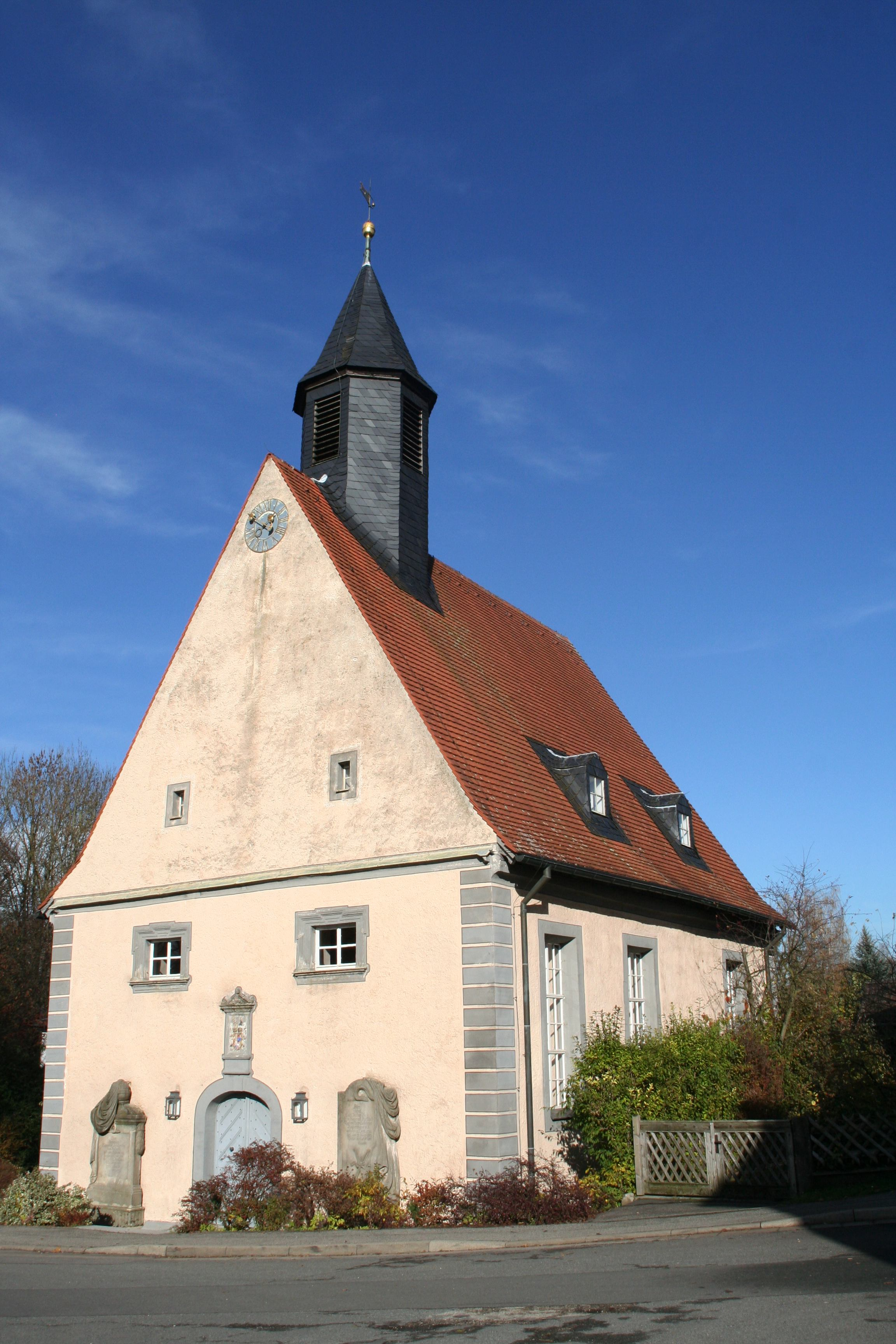
Niederfüllbach castle church

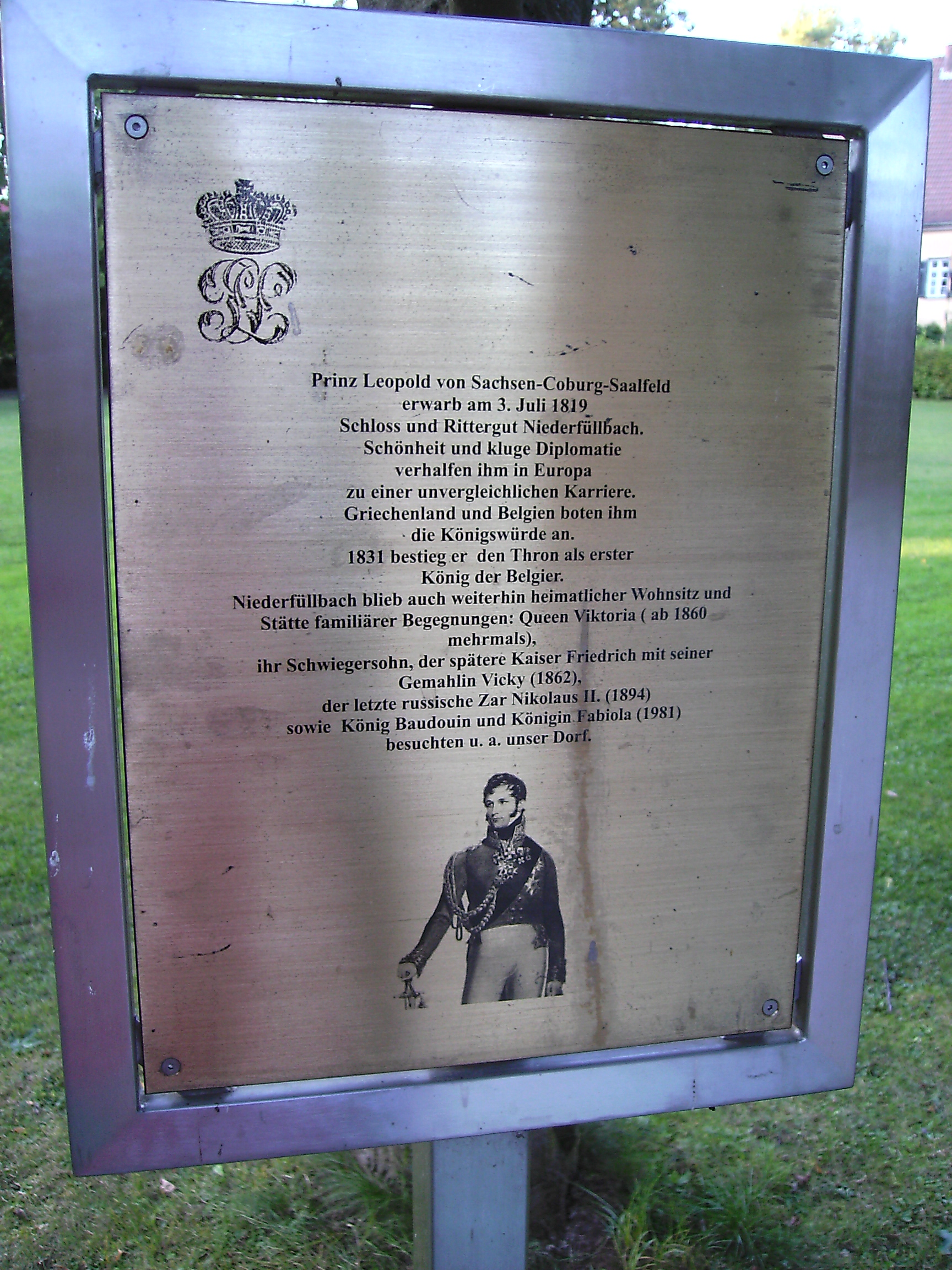

== See also ==
- Niederfüllbacher Stiftung
