= Coburg =

- Town
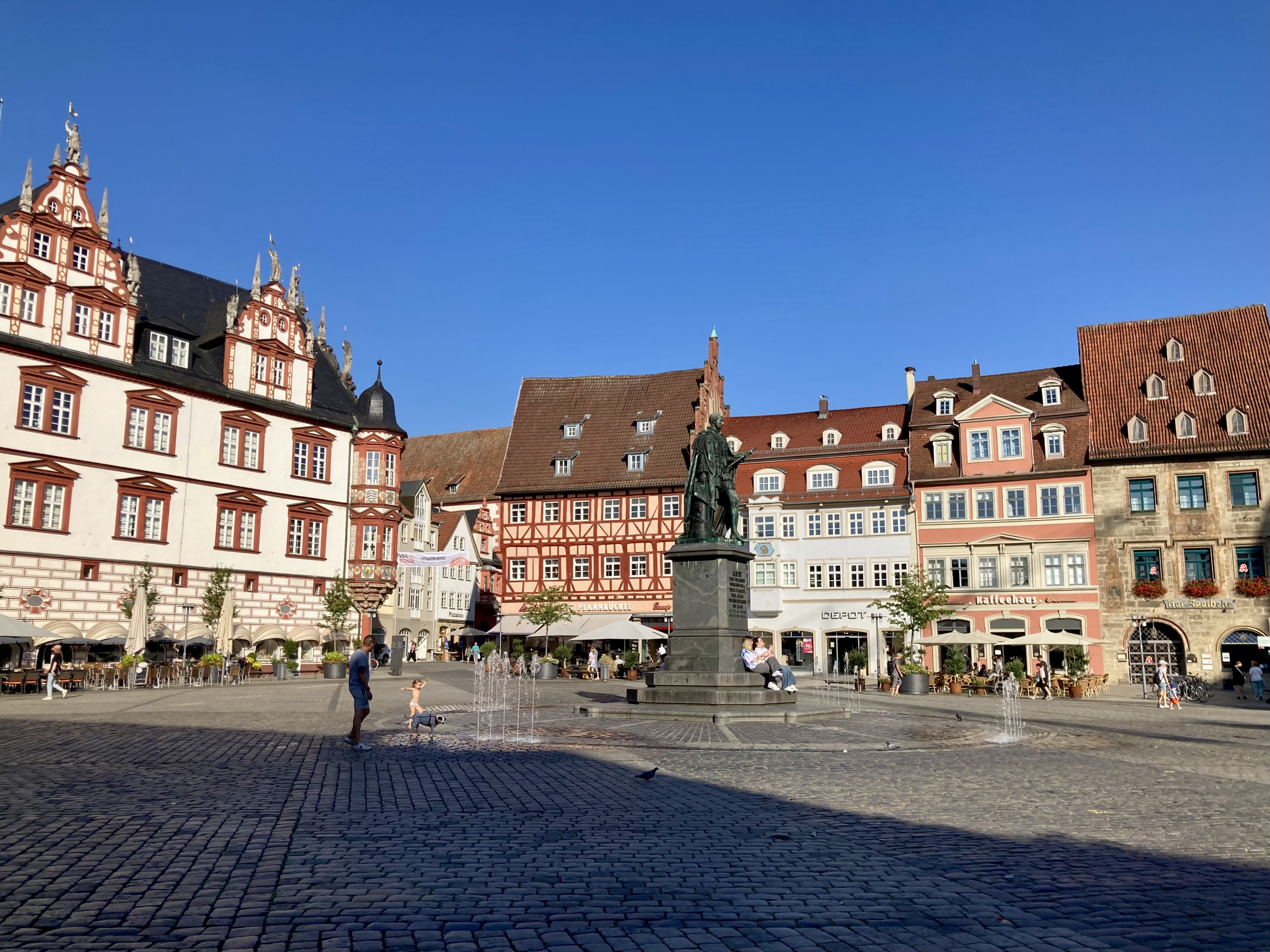
- Coburg Marktplatz with Stadthaus (left)

- Flag Coat of arms
- Interactive map of Coburg
- Location within Germany Location within Bavaria
- Coordinates: 50°16′N 10°58′E
- Country: Germany
- State: Bavaria
- Admin. region: Oberfranken
- District: Urban district

Government
  - Mayor (2026–32): Dominik Sauerteig (SPD)

Area
  - Total: 48.30 km^{2} (18.65 sq mi)
- Elevation: 292 m (958 ft)

Population (2025-12-31)
  - Total: 40,970
  - Density: 848.2/km^{2} (2,197/sq mi)
- Time zone: UTC+01:00 (CET)
  - Summer (DST): UTC+02:00 (CEST)
- Postal codes: 96450
- Dialling codes: 09561
- Vehicle registration: CO
- Website: www.coburg.de

Coburg (/ˈkoʊbɜːrɡ/ KOH-burg, German: [ˈkoːbʊʁk]) is a city located on the River Itz in the Upper Franconia region of Bavaria, Germany. Long part of one of the Thuringian states of the Wettin line, it joined Bavaria by popular vote only in 1920. Until the revolution of 1918, it was one of the capitals of the Duchy of Saxe-Coburg and Gotha and the Duchy of Saxe-Coburg-Saalfeld.

Through successful dynastic policies, the ruling princely family married into several of the royal families of Europe, most notably in the person of Prince Albert, who married Queen Victoria in 1840. As a result of these close links with the royal houses of Europe in the late 19th and early 20th centuries, Coburg was frequently visited by the crowned heads of Europe and their families.

Coburg is the location of Veste Coburg, one of Germany's largest castles.

Today, Coburg's population is close to 41,500. Since it was not damaged much in World War II, Coburg retains many historic buildings, making it a popular tourist destination.

== Geography ==
A map of Coburg

=== Location ===
Coburg lies about 90 kilometres (56 miles) south of Erfurt and about 100 kilometres (62 miles) north of Nuremberg on the River Itz. It is an urban district and is surrounded by the Landkreis Coburg. Coburg lies at the foot of the Thuringian Highlands. Coburg, Bavaria was part of West Germany until reunification in 1990, but it borders on Thuringia, which was in East Germany, on three sides. The border between Bavaria and Thuringia was part of the inner German border.

=== Subdivisions ===
Coburg is divided into 15 Stadtteile, or areas:

- Coburg (the town proper)
- Beiersdorf
- Bertelsdorf
- Cortendorf
- Creidlitz
- Glend
- Ketschendorf
- Löbelstein
- Lützelbuch
- Neu- and Neershof
- Neuses
- Rögen
- Scheuerfeld
- Seidmansdorf
- Wüstenahorn

== History ==
=== 11th century to 16th century ===
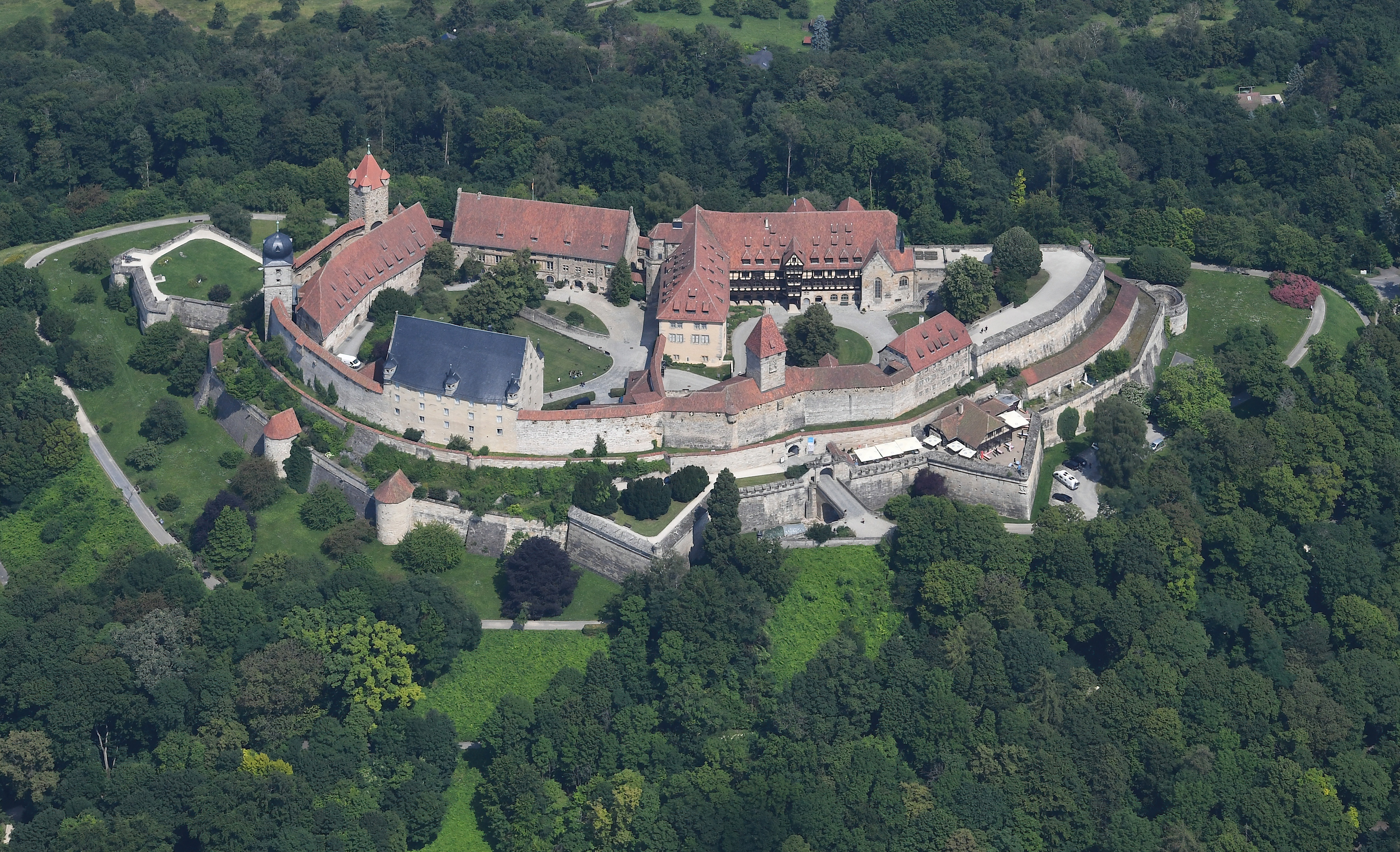
The Veste Coburg fortress

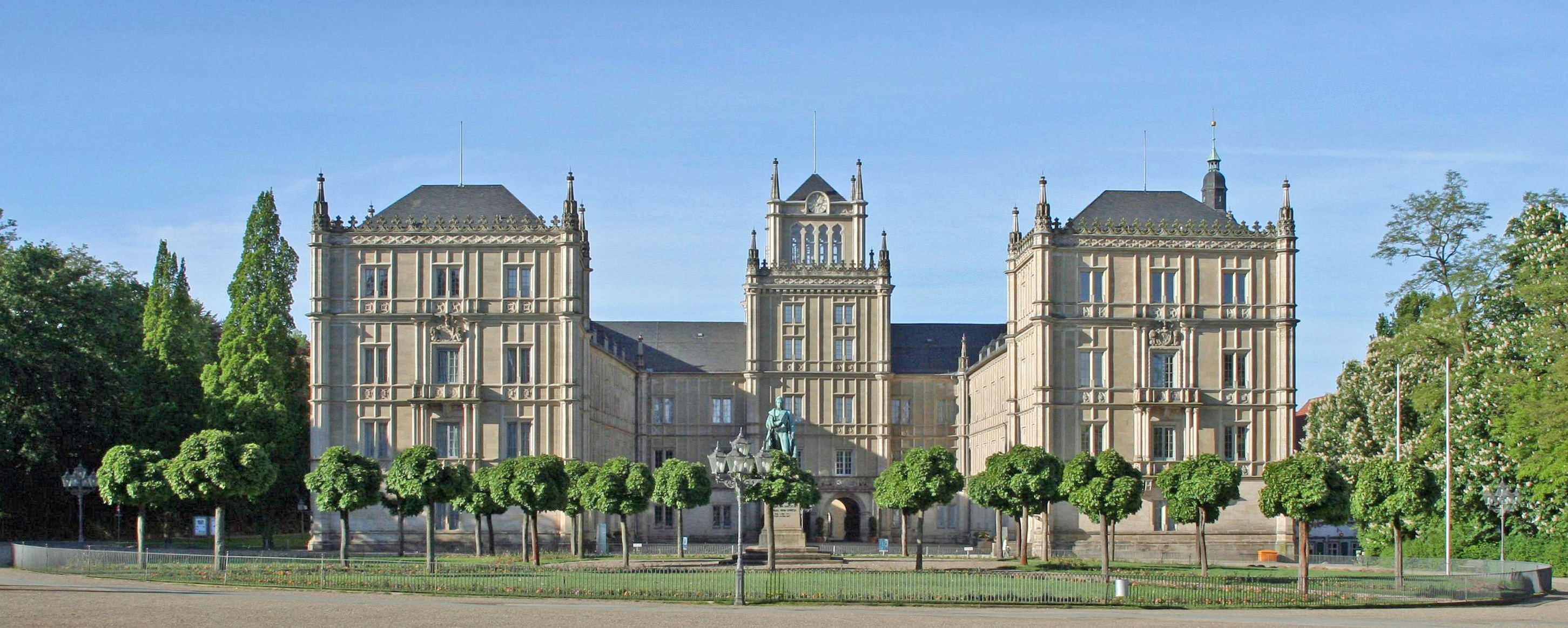
Ehrenburg Palace, rebuilt after a catastrophic fire in 1690, received its Gothic revival exterior in the 19th century.

Coburg was first mentioned in a monastic document dated 1056, which marked the transfer of ownership to the Archbishop-Elector of Cologne, although there was a settlement at the site that predates it called Trufalistat. The origin of the name Coburg is unclear; the first element may be kuh, which would give a literal meaning of "cow borough".

"Coburg" initially referred to a property centred on the hill where Veste Coburg was later built. Its oldest remains date back to the 12th or 13th century. In 1248, the castle came into possession of the House of Henneberg and in 1353 it passed to the House of Wettin with the marriage of Frederick III with Catherine of Henneberg and was initially regarded by them as a Saxon outpost within Franconia.

During the Diet of Augsburg in 1530, the religious reformer Martin Luther spent six months at the castle (located at the southernmost point of the Saxon duchy) while his liege lord, John, Elector of Saxony, attended the Diet. Luther was forbidden to attend by the Elector, who feared that he would be imprisoned and burned as a heretic. While quartered at the castle, Luther continued with his translation of the Bible into German.

In 1547, the princely residence was moved from the Veste to a former monastery rebuilt as a Renaissance palace, the Ehrenburg.

=== 17th century to early 20th century ===
In 1596, Coburg was raised to the status of capital of one of the dynasty's splintered Saxon-Thuringian territories, the newly created Duchy of Saxe-Coburg under the leadership of Duke John Casimir (ruled 1596–1633). From 1699 to 1826, it was one of the two capitals of the Duchy of Saxe-Coburg-Saalfeld and from 1826 to 1918 it was a capital of the Duchy of Saxe-Coburg-Gotha.

Ernest Frederick, the fourth Duke of Saxe-Coburg-Saalfeld, moved his capital from Saalfeld to Coburg in 1764. Coburg then became capital of the Duchy of Saxe-Coburg-Saalfeld and later of the Duchy of Saxe-Coburg and Gotha.

In the early 19th century, the town's medieval fortifications were demolished and replaced by parks. The duke also started the collection of copperplate engravings that is now part of the Veste Coburg museum. The Schlossplatz was created under his son, Ernest, along with what is now the Landestheater Coburg. Ernest also rebuilt the Ehrenburg in Gothic revival style.

In the mid-19th century, Duke Ernest II supported national and liberal ideas and Coburg hosted the first meeting of the German National Association, the founding of the Deutscher Sängerbund and the first Deutsches Turnfest (national sports festival).

During the 19th century, dynastic marriages created ties with the royal families of Belgium, Bulgaria, Portugal and Britain. This turned the ducal family from the rulers of a fairly obscure backwater duchy into one playing an influential role in European politics. The era of political influence peaked with Leopold Frederick; born Prince of Saxe-Coburg-Saalfeld, becoming the King of Belgium in 1831 and Prince Albert of Saxe-Coburg and Gotha, born in Schloss Rosenau, marrying his first cousin, Queen Victoria in 1840.

The marriage between Albert and Victoria established the present British royal house, which renamed itself Windsor during World War I. This marriage led to a union with Germany's ruling dynasty, the Hohenzollerns, when the couple's eldest child, Victoria, married the future Kaiser Friedrich III.

After her marriage, Queen Victoria said of Coburg:

If I were not who I am, this would have been my real home, but I shall always consider it my second one.

Due to the royal connections among the royal houses of Europe, Coburg was the site of many royal Ducal weddings and visits. Britain's Queen Victoria made six visits to Coburg during her 63-year reign. In 1894 the wedding of Ernest Louis, Grand Duke of Hesse and Princess Victoria Melita of Saxe-Coburg and Gotha brought together Queen Victoria, her son Edward (future Edward VII), her second son Alfred (Duke of Saxe-Coburg-Gotha), her daughter the German Dowager Empress Friedrich (Victoria), and many of her grandchildren, such as future Tsar Nicholas and Alexandra of Russia (Alix of Hesse), Kaiser Wilhelm II of Germany, and the future King George V of the United Kingdom.

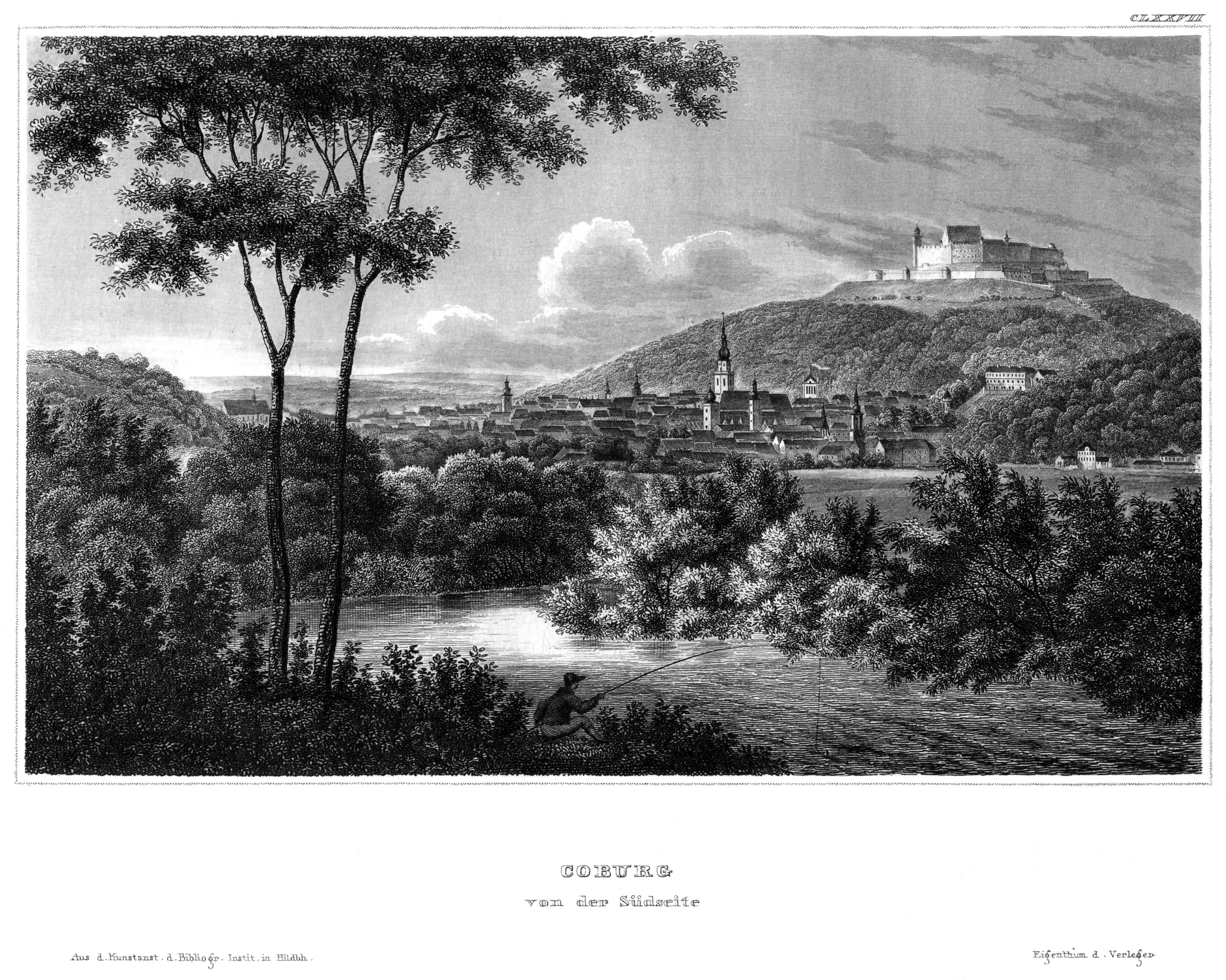
Old print image of Coburg, seen from the south

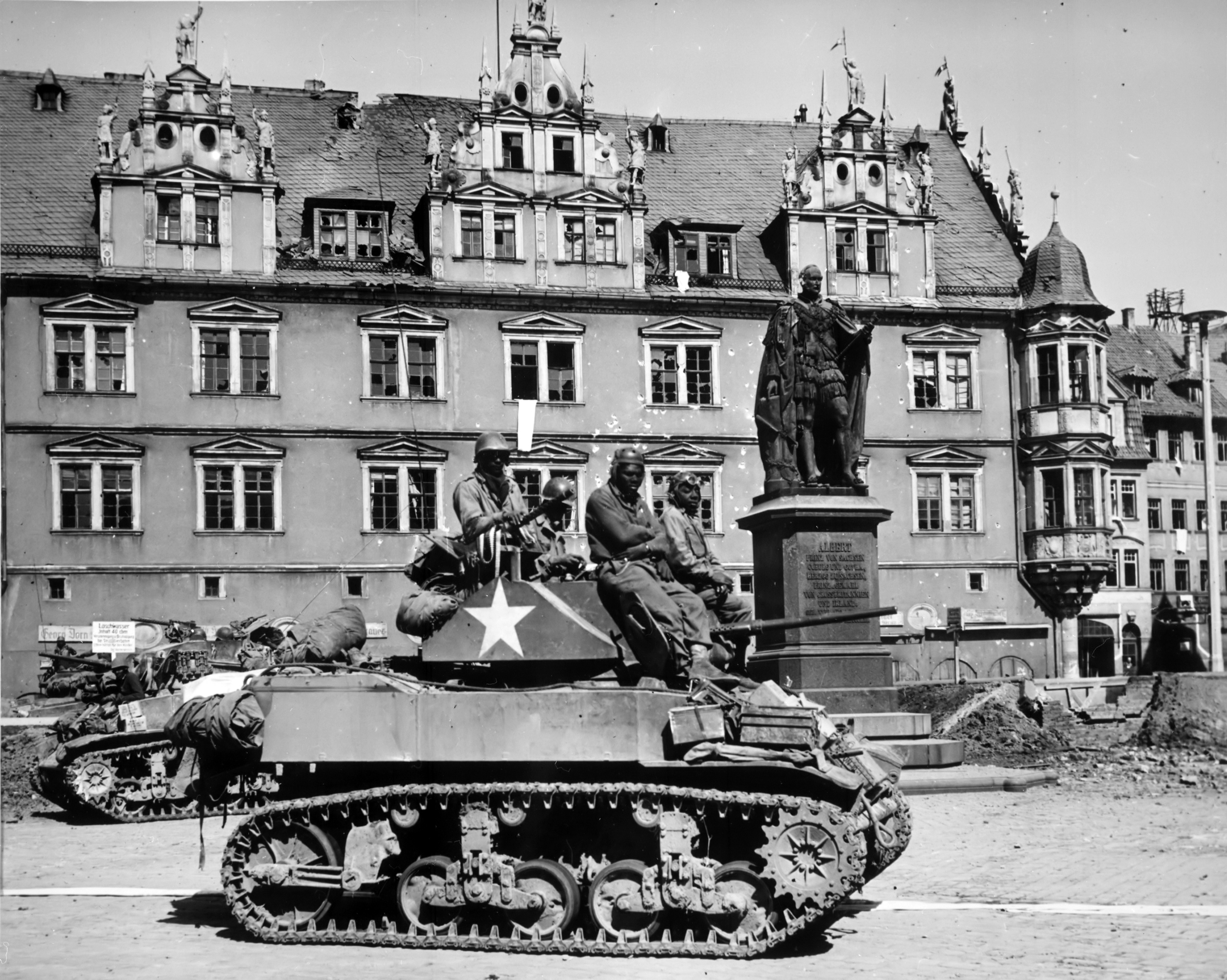
US Army soldiers in Coburg, April 1945

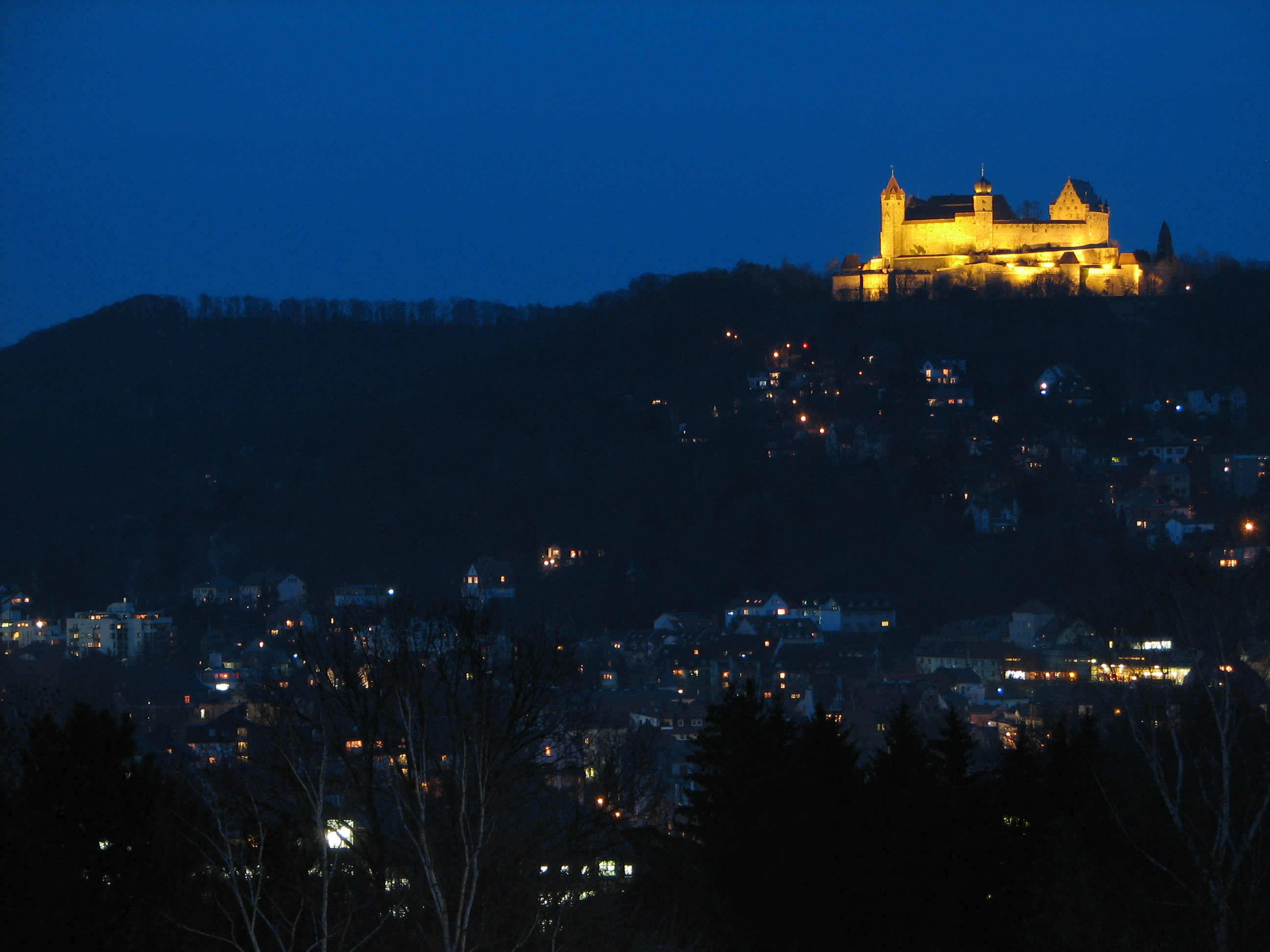
Veste Coburg at night, 2007

In November 1918, during the German revolution that broke out in the final weeks of World War I, the last duke of Saxe-Coburg and Gotha, Charles Edward, abdicated. The Free State of Coburg which then came into being had to decide whether to become part of Thuringia or Bavaria. In a referendum held in November 1919, local citizens voted to join Bavaria by an 88% majority. The merger took place on 1 July 1920.

=== Nazi era ===
In 1929, Coburg was the first German town in which the Nazi Party won the absolute majority of the popular vote during municipal elections. In 1932, Coburg was the first German town to make Adolf Hitler an honorary citizen.

=== Jewish community of Coburg ===
Coburg had Jewish citizens as early as the 14th century. In the 1870s they were granted permission to permanently lease the Church of St. Nicholas for conversion into a synagogue. In 1931 an unofficial boycott was imposed against Jewish businesses. In 1932 the municipal council abrogated the lease of St. Nicholas Church. In 1933 the synagogue was closed down. It still remains standing. On 25 March 1933, 40 Jews in Coburg were arrested and tortured. They were not released until the affair became internationally known.

On 9 November 1938, Kristallnacht, all Jewish men were interned. Jewish homes, shops, and the school were destroyed. Coburg's Jewish community numbered 68 in 1869, 210 (1.3% of the total population) in 1880, 316 (1.3%) in 1925, and 233 (0.9%) in 1933. Around 150 managed to leave by 1942, either emigrating from Germany or moving to other German cities. The rest were deported to Riga, Izbica, and Theresienstadt in three transports between November 1941 and September 1942. The memorial book of the German Federal Archives for the victims of the Nazi persecution of Jews in Germany lists in particular 63 Jewish inhabitants of Coburg, who were deported and mostly murdered. Coburg's Jewish community was not re-established after the war.

=== Post World War II ===
After World War II, which Coburg survived largely undamaged, the town faced the challenge of integrating over 15,000 refugees. While the other Saxon-Thuringian principalities were incorporated into the German Democratic Republic, Bavarian Coburg became part of West Germany. As a result, the town spent the Cold War years lying right next to the Iron Curtain, surrounded by East German territory on three sides and cut off from much of its natural back country.

In 1946, Polish ambassador Oskar R. Lange alleged that Coburg was a base for the Western Allies to organize a Polish armed insurgency led by Władysław Anders against the Soviet-backed communists in Poland.

== Demographics ==
Over two-thirds of Coburg's population live in the core town of Coburg rather than in one of the Stadtteile merged with it in the 20th century. Some of those retain a largely rural character.

=== Religion ===
Most residents of Coburg are members of the Evangelical Church (Lutheran). Other Christian communities are Baptists, Seventh-day Adventists, the ICF Movement, Jehovah's Witnesses, Catholics, Old Catholics and the New Apostolic Church, as well as the Church of Jesus Christ of Latter-day Saints. There are also three communities of Muslims. Coburg had a Jewish community until the 1940s. Jews had lived there since the 14th century. The old synagogue was a former church (see above). Today it is used by Old Catholics. Coburg became Protestant after the Reformation. All Catholics were persecuted. A new Catholic community was founded in the 19th century.

== Climate ==
Coburg has an oceanic climate (Cfb in the Köppen climate classification).

Climate data for Coburg (Lautertal) (1991–2020 normals, extremes 1947–present)
Month	Jan	Feb	Mar	Apr	May	Jun	Jul	Aug	Sep	Oct	Nov	Dec	Year
Record high °C (°F)	14.7 (58.5)	17.3 (63.1)	23.2 (73.8)	30.6 (87.1)	31.8 (89.2)	34.5 (94.1)	37.8 (100.0)	37.8 (100.0)	32.3 (90.1)	26.8 (80.2)	19.3 (66.7)	15.9 (60.6)	37.8 (100.0)
Mean daily maximum °C (°F)	2.6 (36.7)	4.3 (39.7)	9.0 (48.2)	14.6 (58.3)	18.8 (65.8)	22.2 (72.0)	24.4 (75.9)	24.4 (75.9)	19.1 (66.4)	13.3 (55.9)	6.8 (44.2)	3.4 (38.1)	13.6 (56.5)
Daily mean °C (°F)	0.1 (32.2)	0.8 (33.4)	4.4 (39.9)	9.1 (48.4)	13.3 (55.9)	16.5 (61.7)	18.5 (65.3)	18.1 (64.6)	13.7 (56.7)	9.0 (48.2)	4.2 (39.6)	1.0 (33.8)	9.1 (48.4)
Mean daily minimum °C (°F)	−2.5 (27.5)	−2.4 (27.7)	0.3 (32.5)	3.5 (38.3)	7.5 (45.5)	10.6 (51.1)	12.6 (54.7)	12.4 (54.3)	8.8 (47.8)	5.3 (41.5)	1.5 (34.7)	−1.3 (29.7)	4.7 (40.5)
Record low °C (°F)	−22.8 (−9.0)	−24.6 (−12.3)	−17.8 (0.0)	−9.2 (15.4)	−3.9 (25.0)	−0.1 (31.8)	1.4 (34.5)	2.6 (36.7)	−1.8 (28.8)	−6.3 (20.7)	−12.8 (9.0)	−23.5 (−10.3)	−24.6 (−12.3)
Average precipitation mm (inches)	57.0 (2.24)	44.2 (1.74)	45.4 (1.79)	39.4 (1.55)	65.2 (2.57)	66.5 (2.62)	84.9 (3.34)	57.9 (2.28)	57.2 (2.25)	50.4 (1.98)	55.7 (2.19)	65.7 (2.59)	681.0 (26.81)
Average precipitation days (≥ 1.0 mm)	17.6	15.5	14.9	13.0	13.4	13.8	15.2	13.2	12.3	14.9	16.4	19.0	179.6
Average relative humidity (%)	85.1	81.4	75.6	68.7	69.5	70.4	70.7	69.7	77.1	83.1	87.0	87.2	77.1
Mean monthly sunshine hours	47.3	71.1	121.5	180.4	205.7	211.4	220.8	208.9	150.5	102.4	44.6	37.4	1,594.3
Source 1: World Meteorological Organization
Source 2: DWD (extremes)

== Economy ==
In 1919 Max Brose and Ernst Jüngling established the metal works Max Brose & Co. to manufacture car parts. The company is still in operation today, as Brose Fahrzeugteile.

In 1950, the Haftpflicht-Unterstützungs-Kasse kraftfahrender Beamter Deutschlands a. G. (today HUK-Coburg) relocated from Erfurt to Coburg. HUK is today the largest employer and largest payer of Gewerbesteuer (local corporate tax) in Coburg.

Kapp Werkzeugmaschinen has been a manufacturer of gear-milling machines since 1953, after taking over the production assets of COMAG (Coburger Maschinenbau GmbH).

Waldrich-Coburg, founded in 1920, manufactures CNC-milling machines in a range of sizes, the largest of which can handle an object of size 50 x 14 x 10 metres.

Founded in 1919, Kaeser Compressors produces air compressors in various sizes.

Coburg has an above-average share of goods-producing employees. In 2013, out of 32,962 employees 10,421 worked in the manufacturing or construction sectors (31% vs. a national average of 24%), 4,853 in trade, transport and tourism, 10,381 in professional services and 7,230 in public and private services.

Hotels in Coburg counted over 61,000 overnight visitors in 2014 (of which around 53,000 were from Germany). They stayed for a total of almost 120,000 nights, or close to two nights per stay on average.

In 2017, the GDP per inhabitant was €91,506 in Coburg, placing it 5th among the 96 urban and rural districts (Bavarian average: €46,698).

== Twin towns – sister cities ==
Coburg is twinned with:

- Cobourg, Canada
- Gais, Italy
- Isle of Wight, England, United Kingdom
- Niort, France
- Oudenaarde, Belgium
- Toledo, United States

== Coat of arms ==
Coburg coat of arms

From 1493: Profile of Saint Maurice

Nazi era: Sword with swastika pommel

Coburg's coat of arms, honouring the town's German patron Saint Maurice, was granted in 1493. In 1934, the Nazi government forbade any glorification of the African race, and they replaced the coat of arms with one depicting a vertical sword with a Nazi swastika on the pommel. The original coat of arms was restored in 1945 at the end of World War II. In 2020, following the murder of George Floyd, worldwide protests against racism erupted. Against this background, a petition emerged to change the coat of arms of Coburg, as the current depiction of a Moor's head is seen as incorporating discriminatory, colonial stereotypes.

== Attractions ==
Coburg has the typical features of a former capital of a German princely state. There are numerous houses from the 16th, 17th and 18th centuries. The most important landmarks include:

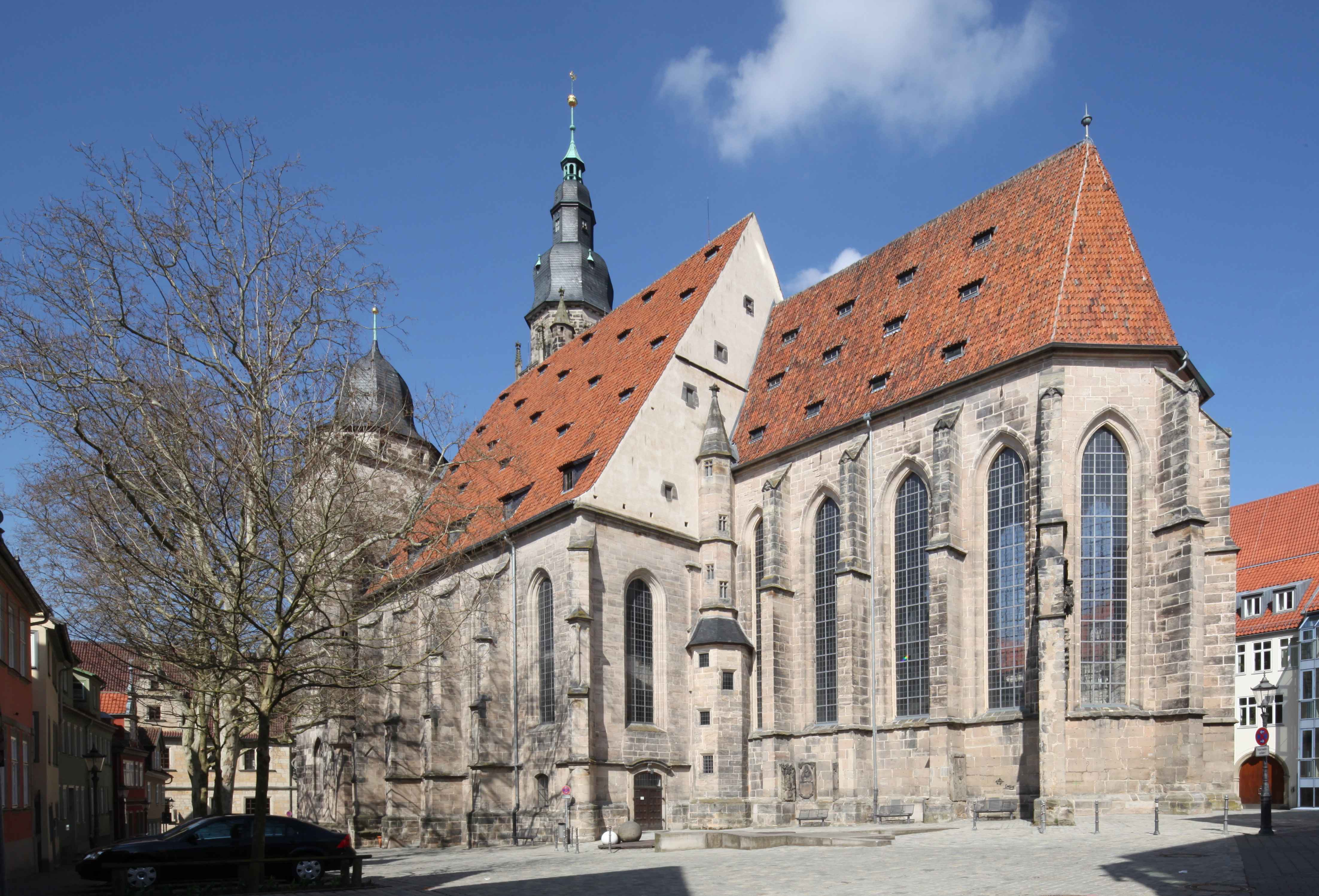
Eastern choir of Morizkirche

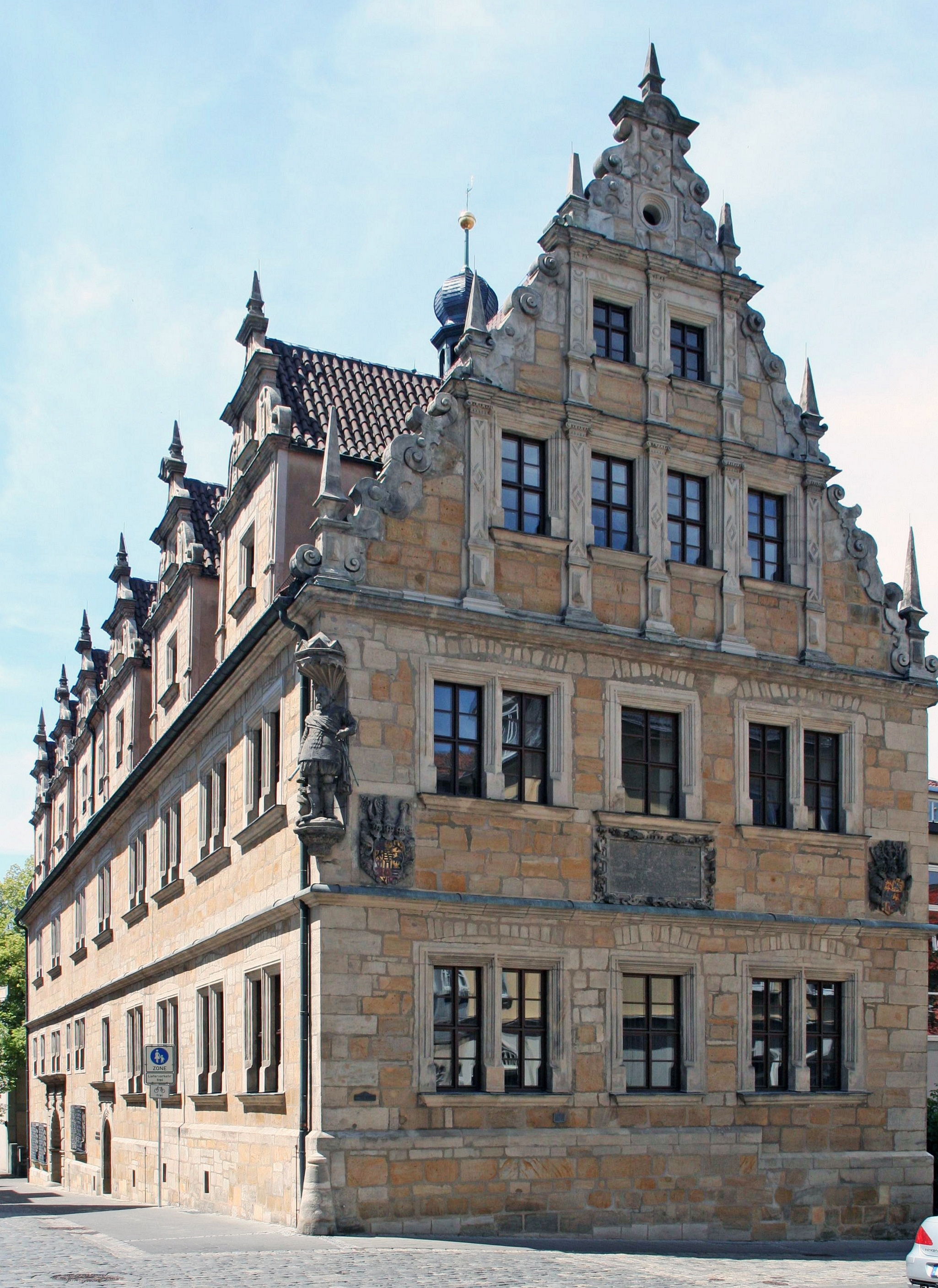
Casimirianum

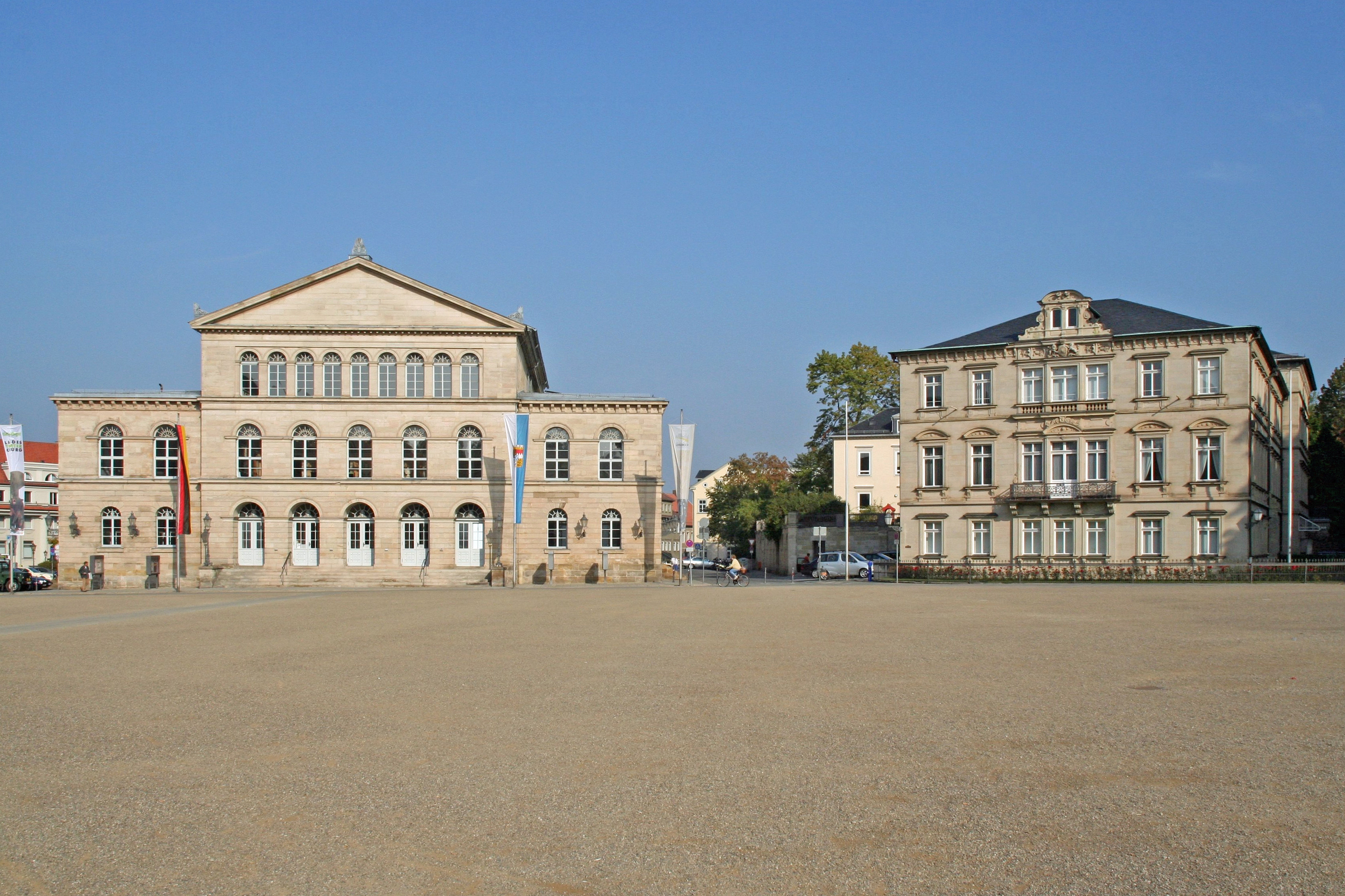
Schlossplatz with Landestheater and Palais Edinburgh

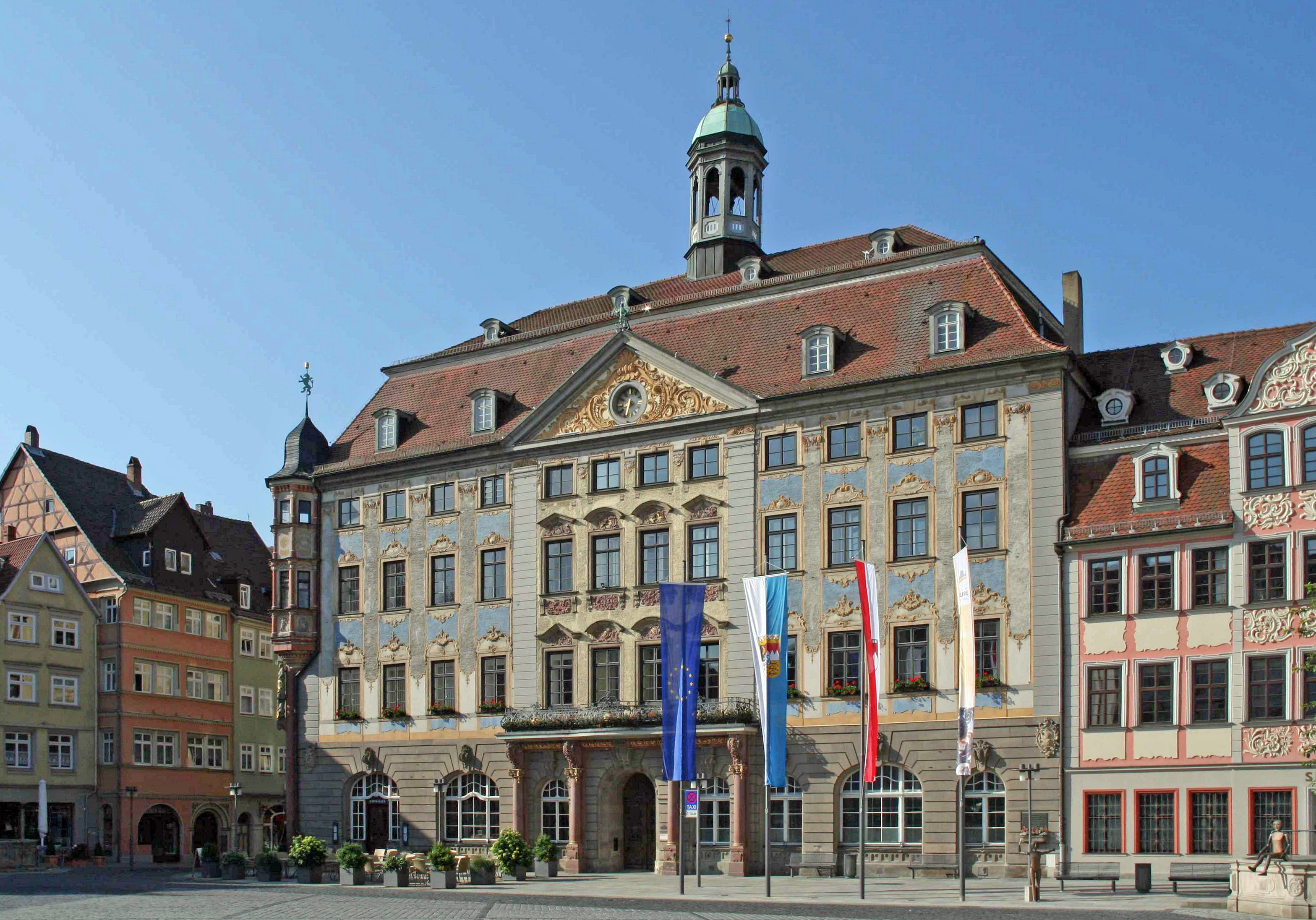
Town hall

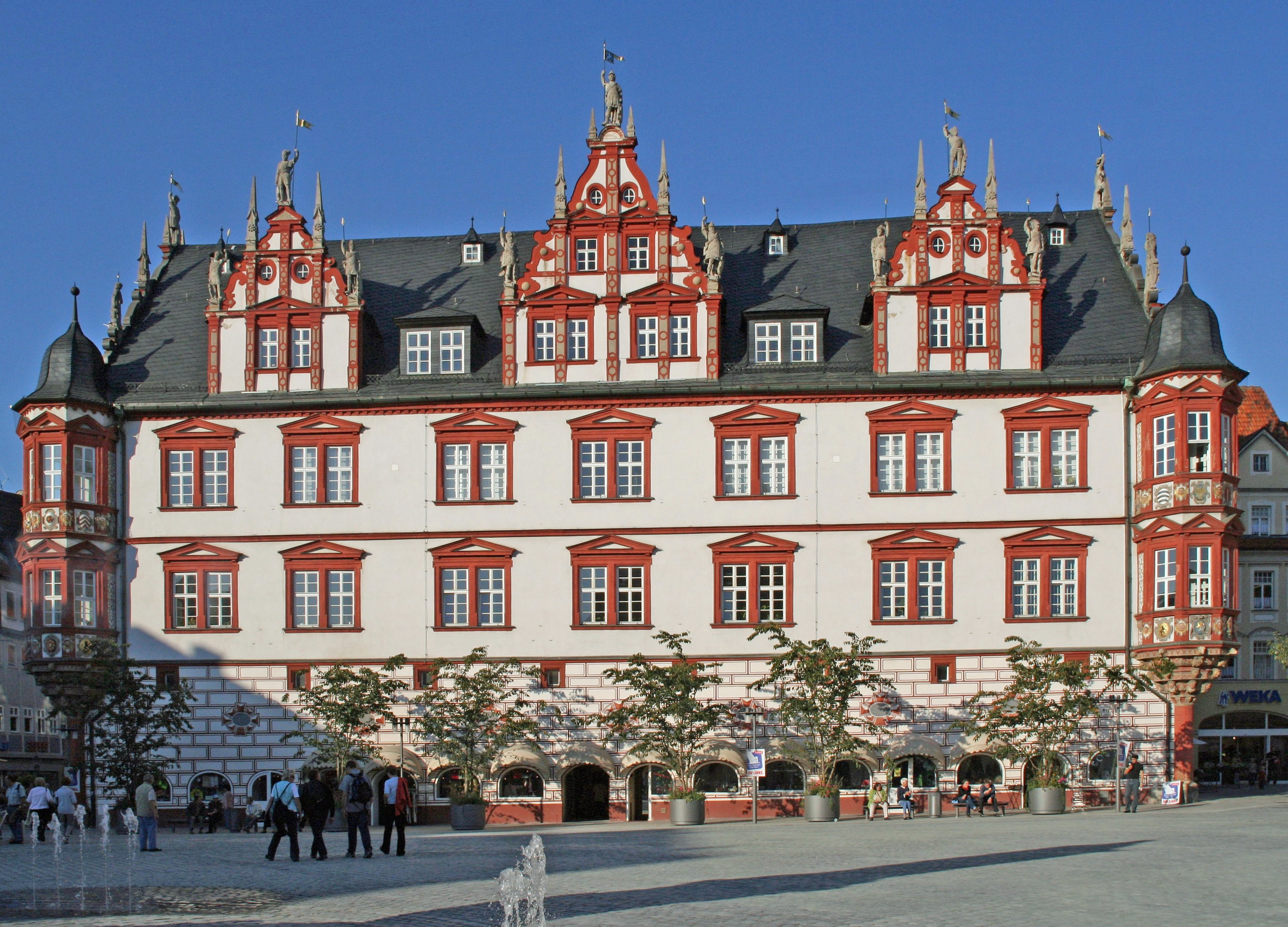
Stadthaus (town house)

- Ehrenburg, a former Franciscan convent built in 1220 and turned into a palace in 1543–1549. It was repeatedly renovated until the 19th century. Ehrenburg was gutted by fire in 1690 and rebuilt in a Baroque style, with stucco work by North Italian craftsmen that includes a "Hall of the Giants" (which contains a plaque that states it was the location of the first meeting between Britain's Queen Victoria and Franz Josef Emperor of Austria in 1860). The internal decoration dates from the late 17th to early 18th centuries. Its Gothic Revival exterior was remodelled by Karl Friedrich Schinkel in the 19th century. It now also houses a museum as well as a library.
- Stadtkirche St. Moriz ("St. Maurice", 14th–16th centuries), is a Gothic edifice on the Hallenkirche plan with two towers. The interior, remade in the 18th century, include the notable funerary moment of Duke Johann Casimir for his parents, a 13 m-tall alabaster sculpture painted with statue and reliefs (1595–1598).
- The medieval Veste Coburg, one of the biggest castles in Germany, built starting in 1225 (upon the site of an 11th-century chapel). It was mostly rebuilt in the 19th century. It has a triple line of walls with numerous towers. Today the Veste Coburg is home to three museums. One is the Fürstenbau (ducal palace), with many furnished rooms of the Dukes of Coburg, including the apartment where Martin Luther lived in 1530. Probably the most notable room in the castle (unique in all of Germany) is the Jagdzimmer (hunting room) of 1632, which is entirely made of marquetry wood inlay, done up with over 60 marquetry panels, deeply coffered marquetry ceilings and a wood paneled floor. Another museum is the Rüstkammer (armory), containing the largest collection of medieval armour and weaponry in Germany, with over 10,500 items. The third is the Kunstsammlungen, which contains a collection of 300,000 copperplate engravings (Kupferstich-Kabinett), a 20,000 piece coin collection (Münzkabinett), a 7,000 piece documentation collection (Briefe & Urkunden), and a 3,500 piece glassware collection (Gläser-Sammlung).
- Gymnasium Casimirianum, a Renaissance building begun in 1601
- Arsenal (1616–21).
- Landestheater Coburg, a Neoclassical theatre on Schlossplatz, whose other landmarks include the Ehrenburg, the Palais Edinburgh (1865), the Arkaden (1840), Reithalle (1852) and Marstall (rebuilt in 1920).
- The Coburg Doll Museum is located near the Schlossplatz and the city centre. It was once the residence of the poet Friedrich Rückert. It houses over 1,000 dolls, including the grandmother of the world-famous "Barbie".
- Natural history museum Coburg.
- Coburger Rathaus, the town hall, part of the ensemble of structure on the market market square that also includes the Stadthaus (see below), the former Beyersches Haus, the Hof-Apotheke, the Stadtbrunnen (fountain) and the central statue of Prince Albert. The seat of the public administration of Coburg was moved here in 1438. The original Gothic building proved to be too small and after 1570 the town bought additional properties and erected a Renaissance building at the corner with Ketschengasse. In another rebuilding in 1750-2 both structures were merged. The appearance of the town hall changed, only the round bay on the corner remained. The old roofs were replaced by the current garret roof and the colourful paintings were added to the façade in the 18th century. Another renovation took place in 1903, when the balcony to the market square was added and stairwell and entrance were redesigned.
- Stadthaus, a late Renaissance building from 1597 to 1599 built under Duke Johann Casimir to house the ducal administration. It occupies the complete northern side of the market square.
- Rose Garden, park.
- Callenberg Castle, with Saxe-Coburg family art collection and National Shooting Museum.
- Schloss Rosenau near Coburg.
- St. Augustin, Catholic parish church opened in 1860.
- The Baroque Basilica of the Vierzehnheiligen, 20 kilometres (12 miles) outside the town.
- The Coburg Bay Windows, a variant of the corner bay window, named so because it was only built in Coburg. It dates from the end of the 16th century and is characterized by three architectural features. These are a supporting pillar in front of the corner of the house, a two-story construction and the closure with a Welsche hood.

== Arts and culture ==
Coburg is home to two major festivals: Samba-Festival Coburg and Johann Strauss Musiktage. Coburg is referred to as "Europe's Capital of Samba."

As a result of the large presence of the US Army prior to German re-unification, Americans and American culture are still present in Coburg and the surrounding area. This influence ranges from American-style pubs and restaurants to two sports clubs sponsoring baseball teams.

== Infrastructure ==
=== Transport ===
==== Car ====
Coburg can be reached by car via B 303 Schweinfurt-Coburg-Schirnding, B 4 Hamburg-Coburg-Nuremberg or motorway A 73 Suhl-Coburg-Nuremberg.

==== Railways ====
Coburg has four train stations:

- Coburg-Neuses
- Coburg-Nord
- Coburg main station
- Coburg-Creidlitz

From the main station one can go to Lichtenfels, Bamberg, Forchheim, Erlangen, Fürth and Nuremberg, to Neustadt bei Coburg, Sonneberg, to Bad Rodach and to Kulmbach, Neuenmarkt-Wirsberg. Since December 2017, the Coburg station is served by Intercity Express high speed trains of the Munich-Nuremberg-Coburg-Erfurt-Berlin(-Hamburg) line (Nuremberg–Erfurt high-speed railway).

==== Airports ====
Small planes can land on the two airfields:

- Coburg Brandensteinsebene (ICAO-Code: EDQC, founded in 1912)
- Coburg Steinrücken (ICAO-Code: EDQY)

Large airports nearby are in Frankfurt, Erfurt and Nuremberg.

==== Local public transport system ====
The public transport system in Coburg is operated by SÜC (Stadt- und Überlandwerke Coburg) with 9 bus lines. The OVF (Omnibus Verkehr Franken) covers Coburg's surrounding countryside with an additional 11 bus lines.

== Notable people ==
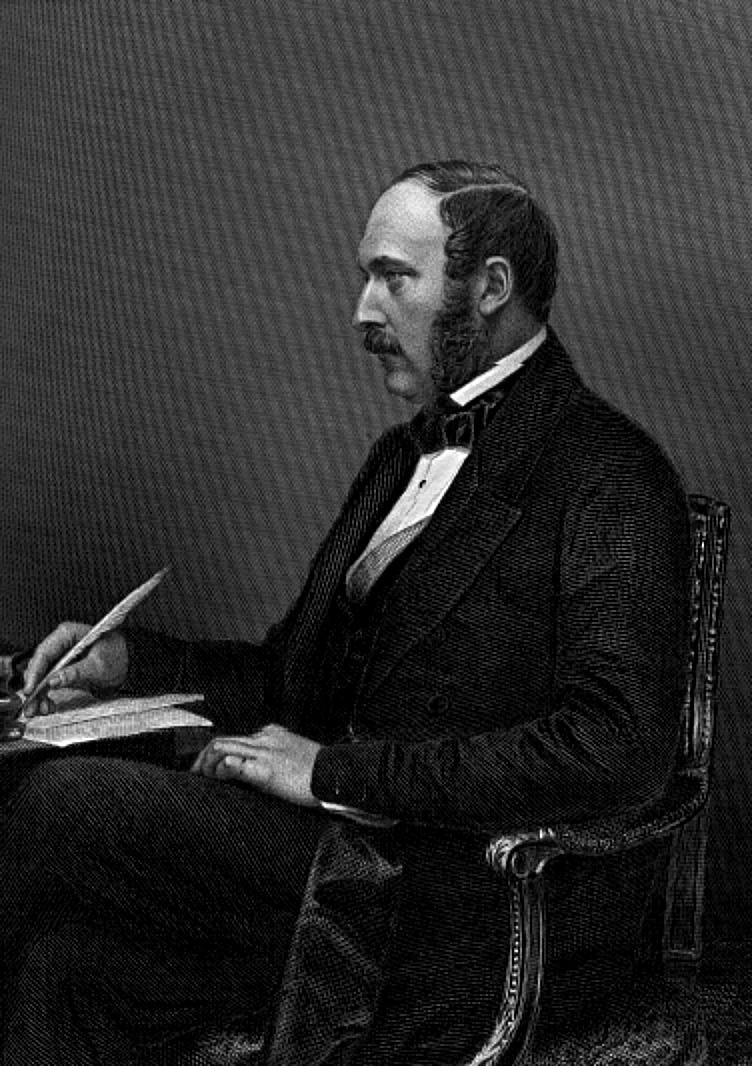
Prince Albert of Saxe-Coburg-Gotha, May 1860

=== Born in Coburg ===
==== Before 1900 ====
- Princess Charlotte Wilhelmine of Saxe-Coburg-Saalfeld (1685–1767), Princess and Countess of Hanau-Münzenberg
- Princess Luise Dorothea of Saxe-Meiningen (1710–1767), Duchess of Saxony-Gotha and Altenburg
- Anton Schweitzer (1735–1787), composer
- Prince Josias of Saxe-Coburg-Saalfeld (1737–1815), Austrian field marshal
- Johann Christian August Clarus (1774–1854), physician
- Leopold I of Belgium (1790–1865), born to Francis, Duke of Saxe-Coburg-Saalfeld, first king of the Belgians
- Alexander von Mensdorff-Pouilly (1813–1871), Austrian statesman
- Ernest II, Duke of Saxe-Coburg and Gotha (1818–1893)
- Prince Albert (1819–1861), husband of Queen Victoria, was born in Schloss Rosenau.
- Heinrich Rückert (1823–1875), historian and Germanist
- William Frishmuth (1830–1893), architect and metallurgist
- Felix Draeseke (1835–1913), composer
- Max Brückner (1836–1919), theater painter
- Princess Amalie of Saxe-Coburg and Gotha (1848–1894), Princess and Duchess in Bavaria
- Bernhard Fischer (1852–1915), hygienist
- Eduard Study (1862–1930), mathematician
- Anna Ritter (née Nuhn, 1865–1921), poet and writer
- Otto Appel (1867–1952), phytomedicine doctor
- Anna Bernhardine Eckstein (1868–1947), champion of world peace
- Hans Berger (1873–1941), neurologist and psychiatrist
- Ernst Marlier (1875–1948), German pharmaceutical manufacturer who built the Wannsee Villa, venue of the Wannsee Conference.
- Princess Alexandra of Saxe-Coburg and Gotha (1878–1942), Princess of Great Britain and Ireland and a member of the House of Saxony-Coburg and the Gotha family and later by marriage Princess to Hohenlohe-Langenburg
- Louis Oppenheim (1879–1936), utility graphic artist
- Fred Immler (1880–1965), actor
- Charles Edward, Duke of Saxe-Coburg and Gotha (1884–1954), the last Duke of Saxony-Coburg and Gotha
- Fritz Mollwitz (1890–1967), professional baseball player, was born here.

==== After 1900 ====
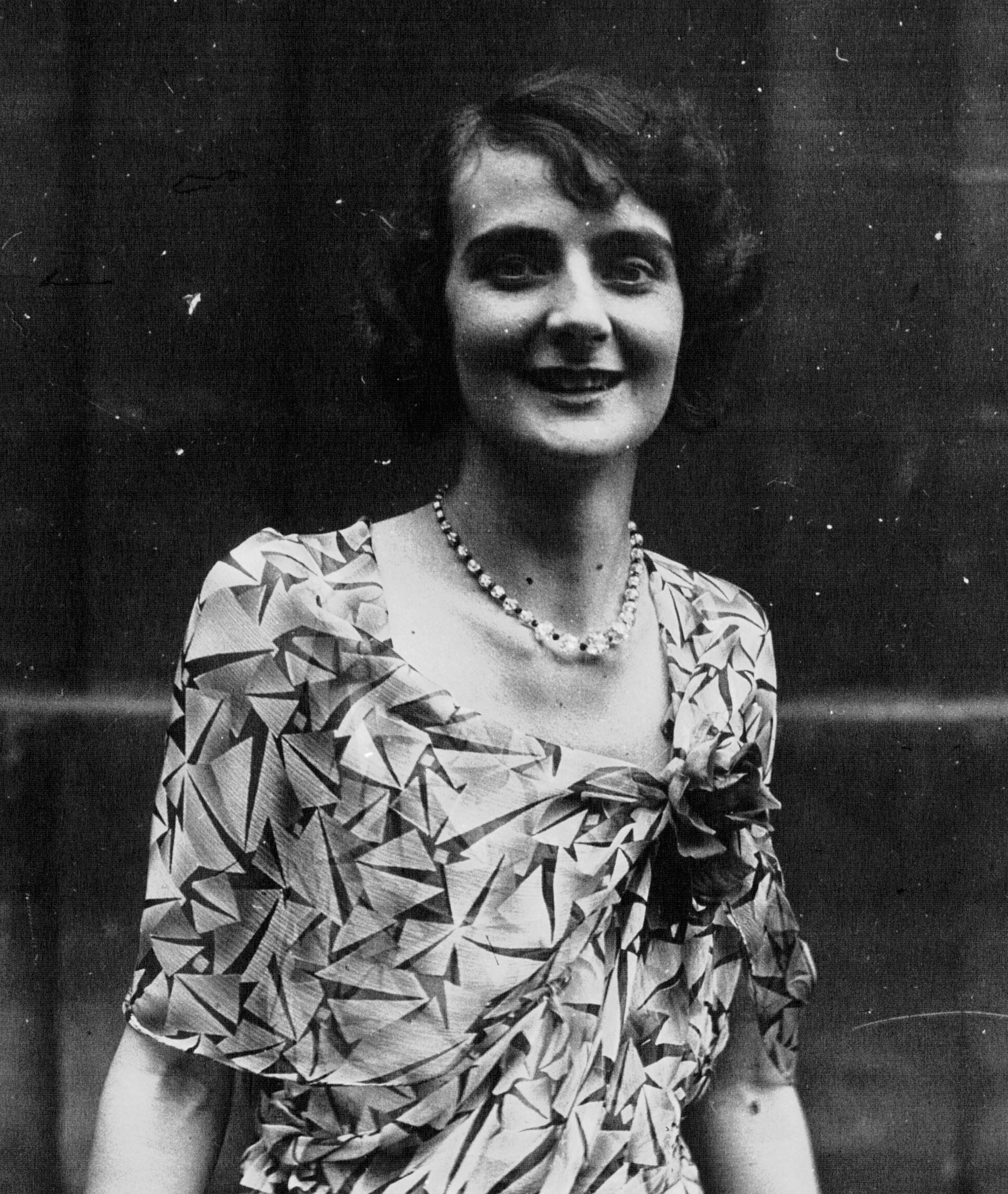
Yvonne Desportes, 1930

- Hans Morgenthau (1904–1980), jurist and political scientist
- Kurt Eccarius (1905–died after 1969), head of the detention area in Sachsenhausen concentration camp
- Ernst Kupfer (1907–1944), fighter pilot in the Second World War
- Yvonne Desportes (1907–1993), French composer
- Princess Sibylla of Saxe-Coburg and Gotha (1908–1972), Princess of Sweden, married to hereditary prince Gustav Adolf of Sweden and mother of King Carl XVI Gustav of Sweden
- Günther Weißenborn (1911–2001), pianist, composer and conductor
- Eva Ahnert-Rohlfs (1912–1954), astronomer
- Wolfgang Stammberger (1920–1982), politician (FDP, SPD), Member of Bundestag, Federal Minister of Justice, Lord Mayor of Coburg
- Heinrich Strecker (1922–2013), composer of operettas and Viennese music
- Werner Scheler (1923–2018), physician and pharmacologist
- Tatunca Nara (born 1941), German-Brazilian impostor
- Klaus Volk (born 1944), lawyer and criminal lawyer
- Klaus-Peter Göpfert (born 1948), wrestler
- Michael Stoschek (born 1948/1949), businessman and entrepreneur
- Klaus Janson (born 1952), American comic artist
- Martin May (born 1961), actor, author and narrator
- Bernd Friedmann (born 1965), musician and producer
- Frank Greiner (born 1966), footballer
- Claudia Porwik (born 1968), tennis player
- Andreas Hackethal (born 1971), professor
- Julia Stoschek (born 1975), art collector
- Cevat Yerli (born 1978), computer game developer
- Martin Forkel (born 1979), footballer
- Andreas Wolf (born 1990), handball player
- Marius Wolf (born 1995), footballer

=== Lived at Coburg ===
- Baroness Louise Lehzen (1784–1870), governess and confidante of Queen Victoria
- Johann Strauss (1825–1899), he lived the last 13 years of his life in Coburg, and buried in Vienna
- Walter von Boetticher (1853–1945), historian, genealogist and physician
- Tsar Ferdinand I of Bulgaria (1861–1948), tsar of Bulgaria.
- Hans Berger (1873–1941), psychiatrist
- Hans Wilsdorf (1881–1960), Founder of Rolex
- Adolf Hitler (1889–1945), in 1922 led several hundred stormtroopers in a march through the city, fighting pitched street battles with communists. During the Nazi era, the Coburg Badge (made to honor the participants) was one of the most prestigious party medals.
