= Max Brose =

German businessman (1884–1968)

- Born: 4 January 1884; Osnabrück, Germany
- Died: 11 April 1968 (aged 84); Coburg, Germany
- Occupation: Businessman
- Known for: Founder of Brose Fahrzeugteile
- Relatives: Michael Stoschek (grandson); Julia Stoschek (great-granddaughter)

Max Brose (4 January 1884 – 11 April 1968) was a German businessman and industrialist. He founded automotive supplier Brose Fahrzeugteile in 1908 and managed it until his death. By that time, the company had grown to 1,000 employees and was the largest German manufacturer of window regulators.

From 1933 to 1945, Brose was a member of the Nazi Party. Under Brose's leadership during World War II, his company used slave labor. He was named a Wehrwirtschaftsführer, an executive of a large company supporting the Wehrmacht during World War II, from 1938 to 1945.

A successful campaign to rename a street after Brose in Coburg in the 21st century was the subject of international media coverage.

== Life and early career ==
Brose completed his education in business administration at age 24 in 1908, after which he established his own trading business for automotive accessories and aircraft materials. Brose was drafted into the German army during World War I. At the end of the war, Lieutenant Brose, who had fought in Germany's motorized forces on the Western Front, was sent to East Prussia to help take down a truck depot. There he met chemist Ernst Jühling, who would become his business partner.

In late spring 1919 they acquired a former metal parts factory in Coburg, a small town in northern Bavaria, and founded Metallwerk Max Brose & Co. OHG, known informally as Max Brose Metal Works. In 1928, following a suggestion by Opel founder Wilhelm von Opel, Brose acquired a manufacturing license for spring-wound brakes, a major component of window regulators, from an American firm. Within a few years, the company evolved as a major supplier of window regulators to German automakers Daimler-Benz, Volkswagen, Borgward, and Lloyd.

In the early 1920s, Brose was a member of the liberal German People's Party as a city council member in Coburg. He later became a member of the national-conservative German National People's Party, which espoused antisemitic views.

During the Great Depression, Brose's company launched the standardized 20-liter gasoline canister.

== Nazi affiliation, activity during World War II ==
Brose joined the Nazi Party on 1 May 1933, and joined the National Socialist Motor Corps in the fall of 1933. By 1935, the Nazi Party controlled Coburg, and Brose was appointed president of the Coburg Chamber of Industry and Commerce (IHK). He was president until it was dissolved in 1943. Brose was named a Wehrwirtschaftsführer in 1938.

During World War II, Brose's automotive company manufactured gasoline canisters and armaments for the German military, partly using forced labor. German historian Andreas Dornheim alleged that Brose served as the company's defense officer, appointed by the German Army High Command and worked with the Gestapo to monitor his workforce for political compliance.

The family-owned company and the family have long said that Brose was a non-ideological member of the Nazi Party who treated his company's forced laborers, largely Soviet prisoners of war, well and had tried to minimize Nazi influence in Coburg. According to a research study by the University of Erlangen and financed by the Brose company, in a postwar denazification court hearing, Brose was ultimately classified as a “follower,” the second-lowest of five levels of complicity, and fined. The study came under scrutiny from scholars for its lack of independence and academic rigor.

At the end of the war, he was tried and convicted as a Mitläufer, a person who was not charged with Nazi crimes but whose involvement with the Nazi Party was considered so significant that they could not be exonerated for the crimes of the Nazi regime.

== Street naming controversy ==
=== Coburg ===
In 2004, Brose's grandson Michael Stoschek, the CEO of Brose Fahrzeugteile, first tried to have his grandfather honoured with a street name in Coburg. After the city refused, Brose Fahrzeugteile allegedly ceased charitable donations to the city, but the city denied that it had been put under financial pressure.

After the Brose-financed study of Brose was released, Stoschek renewed his effort in 2015. The city, citing the research voted to "rehabilitate" Brose and honour him with a "Max-Brose-Straße," despite protests from the Central Council of Jews in Germany, the country's largest Jewish organization. Brose Fahrzeugteile is one of the city's largest employers.

=== Other cities ===
In the 21st century, Stoschek and the Brose company have campaigned to rename streets near the company factories throughout Europe after Max Brose. Brose has streets named after him in Hallstadt and Weil im Schönbuch, Germany, in London, Ontario, Canada, and in Prievidza, Slovakia.

== Personal life ==
In 1935, Brose purchased the villa of a Jewish resident of Coburg named Abraham Friedmann that had been auctioned off as part of Aryanization, the Nazi seizure of property from Jews and its transfer to non-Jews.

Brose's grandson Michael Stoschek became CEO of Brose Fahrzeugteile in 1971. Stoschek's daughter Julia Stoschek, Brose's great-granddaughter, is a prominent German socialite and art collector.
