= Anna Bochkoltz-Falconi =

German operatic soprano, voice teacher and composer (1815–1879)

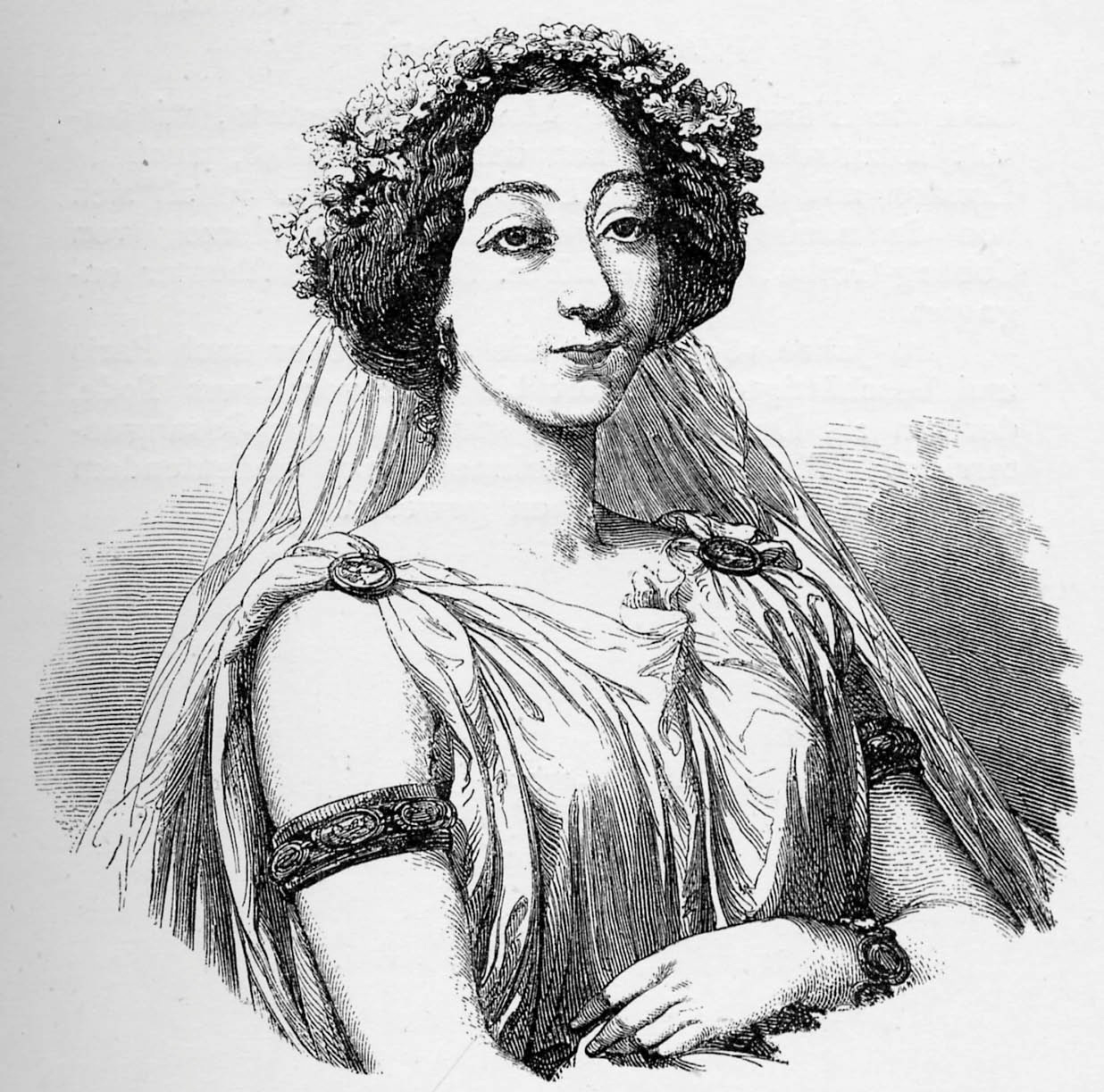
- Born: Anna Juliane Bochkoltz; 11 March 1815; Trier
- Died: 24 December 1879 (aged 64); Paris, France
- Other names: Anna Bochkoltz-Falconi
- Occupations: Operatic soprano; Voice teacher; Composer

Anna Juliane Bochkoltz (also Bochkoltz-Falconi and Anna Falconi, 11 March 1815 – 24 December 1879) was a German operatic soprano, voice teacher and composer. She performed her first concert in 1843, then studied in Brussels and Paris. After singing concerts in Paris, London and Berlin, she appeared in the 1850s on opera stages in Wiesbaden, Frankfurt, Munich and Coburg. She was known for the range of her voice, and was regarded as one of the important dramatic coloratura sopranos of her era, appearing as Mozart's Donna Anna, Beethoven's Fidelio and Bellini's Norma. She later taught singing in Vienna, Strasbourg and Paris.

== Life ==
Born Anna Juliane Bochkoltz in Trier, she was the daughter of the lawyer Johnann Friedrich Joseph Bochkoltz and his wife Barbara, née Sauer. Her nickname was Nanny. She taught drawing from 1831 to 1833 at her mother's private school. She trained her voice, reportedly first with Stephan Dunst. She had contact with Jenny von Westphalen, later the wife of Karl Marx.

She performed her first concert in Trier in 1843. In 1844, she studied at the conservatory of Brussels, in 1845 in Paris. The following year, she became "Membre Solo de la Sociètè du Conservatoire de Paris". She gave concerts in Paris, London, Berlin and Trier. In the 1850s, she appeared on the opera stages of the Hessisches Staatstheater Wiesbaden, the Frankfurt Opera, National Theatre Munich and Landestheater Coburg. Her roles included Donna Anna in Mozart's Don Giovanni, the title role in Beethoven's Fidelio, the title role in Bellini's Norma, and Agathe in Weber's Der Freischütz.

She lived in Vienna from 1856 to 1873 and gave singing lessons. Her students included Ottilie Ebner (1836–1920), Wilhelmine Raab (1848–1917), Ida Benza (1846–1889) and Hermann Rosenberg (1849–1911). She composed songs with piano accompaniment. She lived and taught from 1873 in Strasbourg, and later in Paris, where she died.

She was regarded as one of the important dramatic coloratura sopranos of her era, noted for the range of her voice.

== Performances ==
Bochkoltz appeared at La Scala in Milan on 1 November 1851 in Pergolesi's Lo frate 'nnamorato. On 2 April 1854, she performed a role in the premiere of Santa Chiara, an opera composed by Ernest II, Duke of Saxe-Coburg and Gotha, in Gotha. She appeared as Beethoven's Fidelio in Munich on 21 October 1852. She appeared as Elisabeth in Wagner's Tannhäuser when it was first performed in Coburg, where the action takes place, in December 1854, alongside Julius Réer in the title role.

== Publications ==
- Morgenstunden des Sängers oder vollständige Studien für Tonbildung und Kehlfertigkeit. Ihren Schülerinnen gewidmet. C. A. Spina, Wien (1869).
