= Paul Theissen =

German pianist and conductor

Paul Theissen (born 1937) is a German pianist, conductor and choral conductor.

== Life ==
Born in Aachen, Theissen studied piano, conducting and composition as well as trombone and double bass at the Hochschule für Musik und Tanz Köln. He passed the A-examination in organ in Aachen.

From 1961 to 1966, Theissen was a répétiteur at the Deutsche Oper am Rhein in Düsseldorf and from 1967 to 1973, conductor and from 1969 director of studies at the Staatstheater Mainz. From 1974 to 1980, he was also conductor and solo répétiteur at the Stadttheater Bern. In 1980, he became first Kapellmeister at the Landestheater Coburg. From 1982 to 1985, he was general music director there. He then lived in the United States for three years, where he worked with the symphony orchestras in Tennessee and Riverside. In 1991, he became music director at the Theater Plauen-Zwickau.
