= Kapp Niles =

Germany-based manufacturer

KAPP GmbH & Co. KG, Holding im KAPP NILES Firmenverbund
- Type: GmbH & Co. KG
- Industry: Manufacturing
- Founded: 1953; 73 years ago
- Headquarters: Coburg, Germany
- Area served: Worldwide
- Key people: Matthias Kapp; Michael Kapp; Michael Bär
- Products: Grinding tools, dressing tools, measuring machines
- Revenue: € 167.7 Mio. (2018)
- Number of employees: 1000 (2025)
- Website: www.kapp-niles.com

KAPP NILES is a globally operating group of companies with solutions for finishing gears and profiles. The company is headquartered in Coburg, Germany.

== History ==
In 1953, Bernhard Kapp, managing director and partner of the company Waldrich Coburg, founded the machine building company KAPP & Co.. The company started its activities with the continuation of the production program of woodworking machines from COMAG (Coburger Maschinenbau GmbH), whose assets were purchased.

In 1958, the company began the construction of tool grinding machines. Surface and profile grinding as well as milling machines were built. According to the statement of the company, in 1975 the largest hob grinding machine of the world was produced. In 1977 Bernhard Kapp resigned from the Waldrich company and devoted his professional activities only to his own company.

Since the 1980s KAPP provides profile grinding machines among others for the aerospace and automotive industry as well as for transmission manufacturers. In 1981, worldwide the first non-dressable profile grinding wheel with CBN technology has been developed. In the 1980s, four subsidiaries were established: KAPP TECHNOLOGIES in the USA, KAPP Technologie in Coburg, Germany, KAPPTEC in Brazil and KAPP JAPAN TECHNOLOGIES in Japan.

In 1983, Martin Kapp joined the company and shared the management with his father Bernhard Kapp and Roman Luft.

In 1997, the KAPP Group acquired Niles Werkzeugmaschinen GmbH with 80 employees. NILES dates back to 1898, when ‘Deutsche NILES Werke AG’ was founded as a licensee of the American tool manufacturer Niles Tool Works Company Hamilton / Ohio and had grinding machines for large gears in its portfolio. 2006 KAPP ASIA TECHNOLOGIES (JIASHAN) was established in the People's Republic of China.

In March 2017, the sales and service activities for KAPP NILES products in Russia and neighbouring countries were combined in Kapp Niles Russia, LLC, based in Moscow.

On 1 April 2017, the company KAPP NILES Metrology GmbH became part of the KAPP NILES Group. It develops, produces and distributes measuring machines, measuring devices and related services, especially for the quality control of gears and profiles. With this new product division, the group of companies is further expanding its product portfolio along the value chain.

In 2020, the KAPP NILES Group opened new branches in Ramos Arizpe, Mexico and Bangalore, India. These branches will expand accessibility in the respective markets and further strengthen the market position.

Martin Kapp retired from the company management on 1 July 2021. His sons Michael and Matthias Kapp have since continued the family tradition and strengthened the management with Michael Bär. Helmut Nüssle has been a member of the management team since 2004. Martin Kapp moved to the advisory board and chairs it.

After many years of commitment as Managing Director of the KAPP NILES Group, Helmut Nüssle retired on January 31, 2024.

In 2025, the group of companies with about 1000 employees worldwide offers a wide range of machine tools for finishing of gears and profiles as well as appropriate tools and measuring machines. External or internal gears and profiles for applications in the automotive, aerospace and compressor industries, drive technology, energy and wind power, railway technology, raw materials extraction and shipbuilding can be ground and measured with these machines.

== Locations ==
KAPP NILES locations: Production sites, sales and service branches, sales partners

The headquarter is located in Coburg in Upper Franconia. Other German locations include Berlin and Großostheim. In total, the KAPP NILES group of companies has 12 locations worldwide, 9 production sites.

== Products ==
KAPP NILES is partner for companies from numerous industrial sectors in the mobility, automation and energy segments. The product range ioncludes:

- Generating(profile) grinding machines
- Profile grinding machines
- Tools (Dressing tools, grinding tools)
- Measuring machines, metrology
- Services
- Digitisation
