= Cortendorf (Coburg) =

District of Coburg, Bavaria, Germany

Coordinates: 50°16′N 10°59′E

Cortendorf is a north-eastern district of the Bavarian city of Coburg.

With a population of 1.349 and a size of 1.65 square kilometres (160 ha; 0.64 sq mi) it has a population density of 818 inhabitants/km^{2}. Cortendorf is the location of the Wirtschaftsschule of Coburg and the Kindergarten of Cortendorf. Industries include the machine tool factory Waldrich and the former brewery of Coburg Scheidmantel, but above all it is valued because of its greenery.
