= Michael Stoschek =

German businessman

- Born: 1947 or 1948 (age 76–77); Coburg, Germany
- Education: Casimirianum Coburg
- Known for: Chairman, Brose Fahrzeugteile
- Spouse: Gabriele Stoschek
- Children: Julia Stoschek; Maximilian Stoschek

Michael Stoschek (born 1947/1948) is a German billionaire businessman, chairman of Brose Fahrzeugteile, the German car parts company founded by his grandfather, Max Brose.

== Early life ==
Michael Stoschek was born in Germany. He was educated at Casimirianum Coburg. His mother Christa was an actress and the youngest daughter of the National Socialist defence industry leader and company founder Max Brose. After starting a commercial apprenticeship in the family-owned company and an apprenticeship at Siemens, Stoschek took over the management of the family business with 1,000 employees and a turnover of DM 50 million from his aunt Gisela Brose in 1971 at the age of 24.

Michael Stoschek has been married since 1972 and is the father of daughter Julia Stoschek and son Maximilian.

== Career ==
Stoschek took charge of Brose Fahrzeugteile in 1971 aged only 24 and grew the company into an international company.

As of November 2015, Forbes estimated his net worth at US$2.4 billion.

== Personal life ==
He is married with two children. His daughter Julia Stoschek is an art collector, specializing time-based media art, and runs the Julia Stoschek Collection in Düsseldorf, which opened in 2007, and has two floors of exhibition space, over 2500 m2. He has a son Maximilian Stoschek.
