= Julia Stoschek =

German socialite and art collector (born 1975)

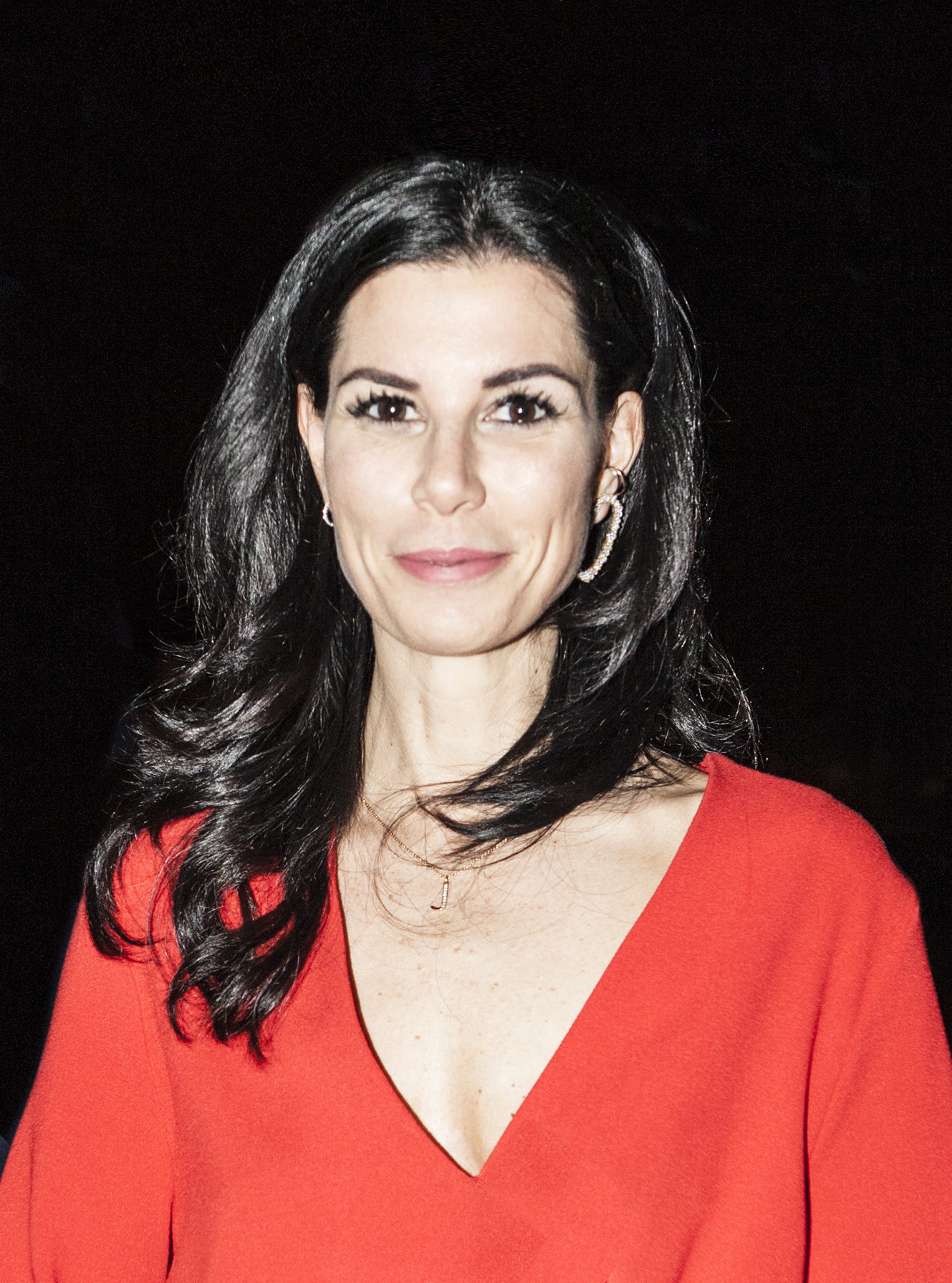
- Born: 10 June 1975 (age 51); Coburg, Germany
- Occupations: Art collector, specializing in time-based media art
- Known for: Julia Stoschek Foundation in Düsseldorf and Berlin
- Parent: Michael Stoschek

Julia Stoschek (born 1975) is a German socialite and art collector.

== Early life and education ==
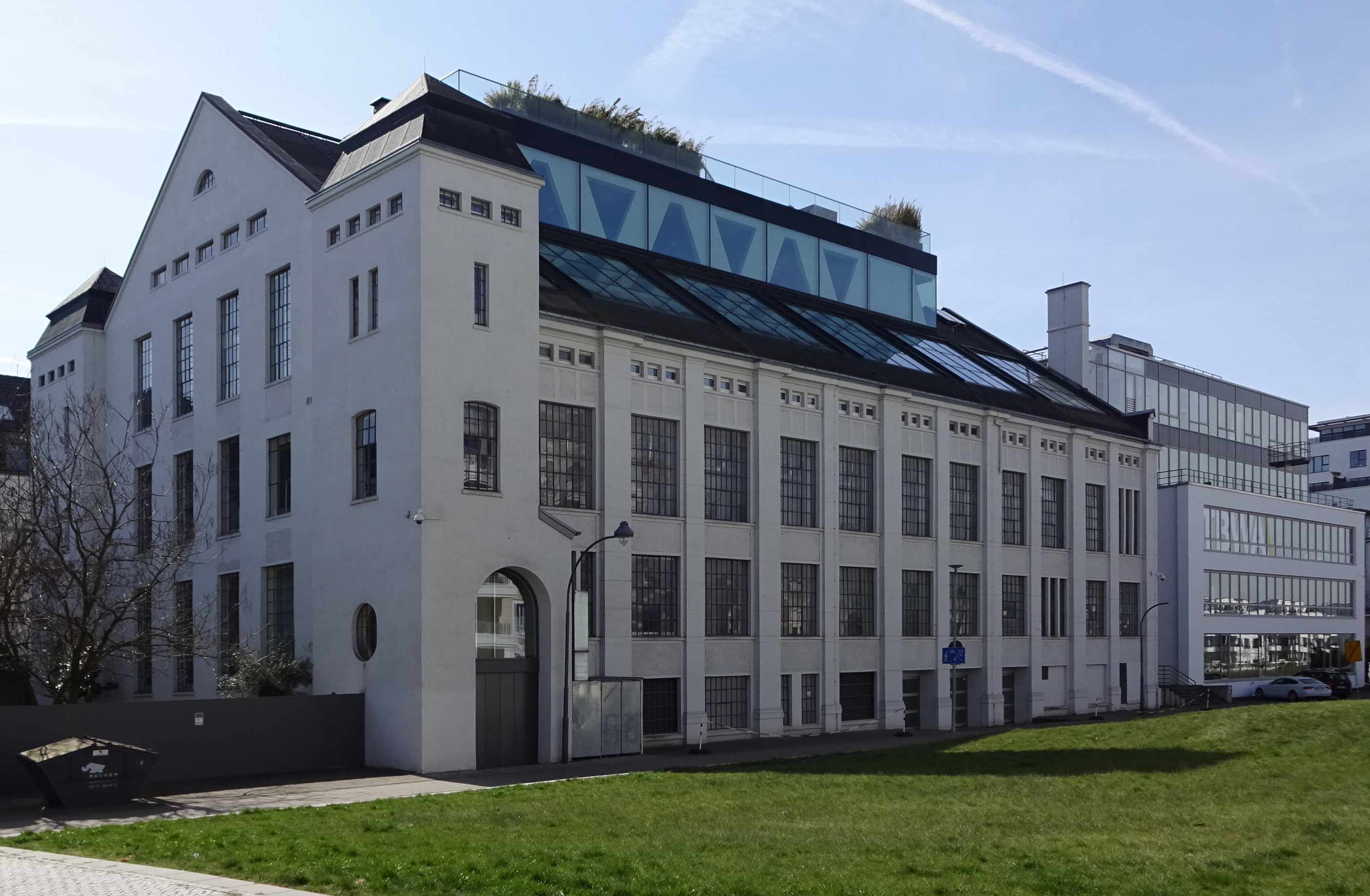
Julia Stoschek Collection in Düsseldorf (2018)

Julia Stoschek was born in 1975, the daughter of Michael Stoschek, a German billionaire businessman and chairman of Brose Fahrzeugteile.

Stoschek spent her childhood in Coburg. While in high school, she was a member of the national dressage squad. She studied business administration at the University of Bamberg and completed internships focusing on arts and cultural management in New York and Munich.

== Art collection ==
Stoschek first began buying art in 2003. Her collection features more than 850 works by about 250, mainly European and US artists working from the 1960s onwards and includes video, multi-media environments, internet-based installations and performance. The Julia Stoschek Collection in a former industrial building in Düsseldorf-Oberkassel opened in 2007, and has two floors of exhibition space, over 2,500 square metres (27,000 square feet). Within the first ten years from 2007 until 2017, the Julia Stoschek Collection staged 15 exhibitions, including solo shows of Cao Fei (2009), Derek Jarman (2010), Sturtevant (2014), Wu Tsang (2015) and Cyprien Gaillard (2015).

In 2016, the Julia Stoschek Collection opened a satellite exhibition space in a former Czech cultural center in Berlin. The space has in the past shown solo shows by artists including Arthur Jafa (2018).

The Julia Stoschek Collection co-sponsored two exhibitions in the German Pavilion at the Venice Biennale: Fabrik (2015) curated by Florian Ebner and Faust (2017) by Anne Imhof.

In 2025, the Julia Stoschek Foundation announced plans to stage “What a Wonderful World: An Audiovisual Poem,” its first major US presentation, held at the historic Variety Arts Theater in downtown Los Angeles and organized by curator Udo Kittelmann in 2026.

== Other activities ==
- Museum of Contemporary Art, Los Angeles, Member of the Board of Trustees (since 2018)
- Kunst-Werke Institute for Contemporary Art, Member of the Board (since 2015)
- MoMA PS1, Member of the Board of Trustees
- Tate, Member of the International Council (since 2015)

== Recognition ==
- 2012 – Montblanc de la Culture Arts Patronage Award
- 2018 – Art Cologne Prize

== Personal life ==
From 2006 until 2010, Stoschek was in a relationship with artist Andreas Gursky. From 2011, she dated art dealer Max Mayer. She has a son with Mathias Döpfner, with whom she was in a relationship from 2013 to 2018.
