= 12th Pennsylvania Cavalry Regiment =

Union Army cavalry regiment

12th Pennsylvania Cavalry
- Active: November 5, 1861 - July 20, 1865
- Country: United States
- Allegiance: Union
- Branch: Cavalry
- Engagements: Second Battle of Bull Run; Battle of Antietam; Second Battle of Winchester

The 12th Pennsylvania Cavalry (113th Volunteers) was a cavalry regiment that served in the Union Army during the American Civil War.

== Service ==
The 12th Pennsylvania Cavalry was organized at Camp McReyonlds in Philadelphia, Pennsylvania November 1861 through April 1862. The regiment was accepted for state and federal service as the "113th Volunteers" and its designation changed to the 12th Pennsylvania Cavalry on November 13, 1861. It mustered in for three years service under the command of Colonel William Frishmuth.

The regiment was attached to Military District of Washington, to September 1862. 4th Brigade, Pleasanton's Cavalry Division, Army of the Potomac, to October 1862. Averill's Cavalry Command, VIII Corps, Middle Department, to November 1862. Defenses Upper Potomac, VIII Corps, to February 1863. 1st Brigade, 2nd Division, VIII Corps, to June 1863. Pierce's Brigade, Department of the Susquehanna, to July 1863. McReynold's Command, Department of the Susquehanna, to August 1863. Martinsburg, West Virginia, Department of West Virginia, to October 1863. 3rd Brigade, 1st Division, Department of West Virginia, to February 1864. Reserve Division, Department of West Virginia, to July 1864. 1st Brigade, 1st Cavalry Division, West Virginia, to August 1864. Reserve Division, Department of West Virginia, to January 1865. 3rd Infantry Division, West Virginia, to April 1865. Cavalry, Army of the Shenandoah, to July 1865.

The 12th Pennsylvania Cavalry mustered out July 20, 1865.

== Detailed service ==
Ordered to Washington, D.C., April 1862. Duty at Washington, D.C., until June 20, 1862. Moved to Manassas Junction, Va., and guard Orange & Alexandria Railroad until August. Moved to Bristoe, then to Alexandria, and picket north bank of the Potomac River from Chain Bridge to Edward's Ferry until September. Maryland Campaign September–October. Frederick, Md., September 12. Battle of Antietam, September 16–17. Assigned to duty on line of the Baltimore & Ohio Railroad, Headquarters at Sir John!s Run and Bath. Martinsburg, W. Va., November 6. Moorefield November 9. Newtown November 24. Kearneysville December 26. Bunker Hill January 1, 1863. Near Smithfield and Charlestown February 12. Millwood Road near Winchester April 8. Reconnaissance from Winchester to Wardensville and Strasburg April 20. Operations in the Shenandoah Valley April 22–29. Strasburg Road, Fisher's Hill, April 22. Scout to Strasburg April 25–30. Cedarville and Winchester June 12. Winchester June 13–15. McConnellsburg, Pa., June 24 Cunningham's Cross Roads July 5. Greencastle, Pa., July 5 (detachment). Near Clear Springs, Md., July 10. Moved to Sharpsburg, Md., then to Martinsburg August 3, and duty there until July 1864. Jeffersonton, Va., October 10, 1863. Near Winchester February 5, 1864. Middletown February 6. Winchester April 26. Affair in Loudoun County June 9 (detachment). Charlestown and Duffield Station June 29, Bolivar Heights July 2. Near Hillsboro July 15–16. Charlestown July 17. Snicker's Ferry July 17–18. Ashby's Gap and Berry's Ford July 19. Near Kernstown July 23. Winchester July 24. Bunker Hill and Martinsburg July 25. Cherry Run July 28. Winchester July 29. Guard and garrison duty at Charlestown, covering railroad from Harpers Ferry to Winchester until March 1865. Charlestown September 27, 1864. Halltown November 12. Mount Zion Church November 12. Newtown November 24. Charlestown November 29 (detachment). Affair at Harpers Ferry February 3, 1865 (detachment). Scout from Harpers Ferry into Loudoun County March 20–23. Near Hamilton March 21. Goose Creek March 23. Duty at Winchester and in the Shenandoah Valley until July.

== Casualties ==
The regiment lost a total of 142 men during service; 2 officers and 32 enlisted men killed or mortally wounded, 1 officer and 107 enlisted men died of disease.

== Commanders ==
- Colonel William Frishmuth - resigned April 20, 1862
- Colonel Lewis B. Pierce - discharged by Special Order, December 15, 1864
- Colonel Marcus A. Reno
- Major James Adams Congdon - commanded at the Battle of Antietam

== See also ==
- List of Pennsylvania Civil War regiments
- Pennsylvania in the American Civil War
