= Heinrich Rückert =

German historian (1823–1875)

Heinrich Rückert (14 February 1823, in Coburg – 11 September 1875, in Breslau) was a German historian and Germanist. He was the son of orientalist and poet Friedrich Rückert (1788–1866).

From 1840 to 1844 he studied classical and German philology at the universities of Erlangen, Bonn and Berlin. In 1845 he obtained his habilitation for German history and archaeology at the University of Jena, and later on, relocated to Breslau, where in 1852 he became an associate professor (full professor 1867). In 1852 he was a founding member of the Verein für Thüringische Geschichte und Alterthumskunde (Society of Thuringian History and Antiquities).

== Published works ==
- Annalen der deutschen Geschichte : Abriß der deutschen Entwickelungsgeschichte in chronologischer Darstellung (3 volumes, 1850) – Annals of German history: Outline of German developmental history in chronological presentation.
- Culturgeschichte des deutschen Volkes in der Zeit des Uebergangs aus dem Heidenthum in das Christenthum (2 volumes 1853/54) – Cultural history of the German people in the time of transition from paganism to Christianity.
- Geschichte des Mittelalters, 1853 – History of the Middle Ages.
- Aus Friedrich Rückert's Nachlass, 1867 – From Friedrich Rückert's Nachlass, edited by Heinrich Rückert.
- Deutsche Geschichte, 1873 – German history.
- Geschichte der Neuhochdeutschen Schriftsprache, 1875 – History of modern High German written language.
- Entwurf einer systematischen Darstellung der schlesischen Mundart im Mittelalter, 1878 – Systematic presentation of the Silesian dialect in the Middle Ages.

He was also editor of medieval texts, such as: Bruder Philipps des Carthäusers Marienleben (1853), Lohengrin (1858), König Rother (1872) and Heliand (1876).
