= Günther Weißenborn =

German classical pianist (1911–2001)

- Born: 2 June 1911
- Died: 25 February 2001 (aged 89)
- Occupations: Classical pianist, accompanist, conductor, teacher

Günther Weißenborn (2 June 1911 – 25 February 2001) was a German classical pianist, accompanist, conductor and academic teacher.

== Awards ==
- 1976: Order of Merit of the Federal Republic of Germany
