= Landestheater Coburg =

Theatre in Coburg, Germany

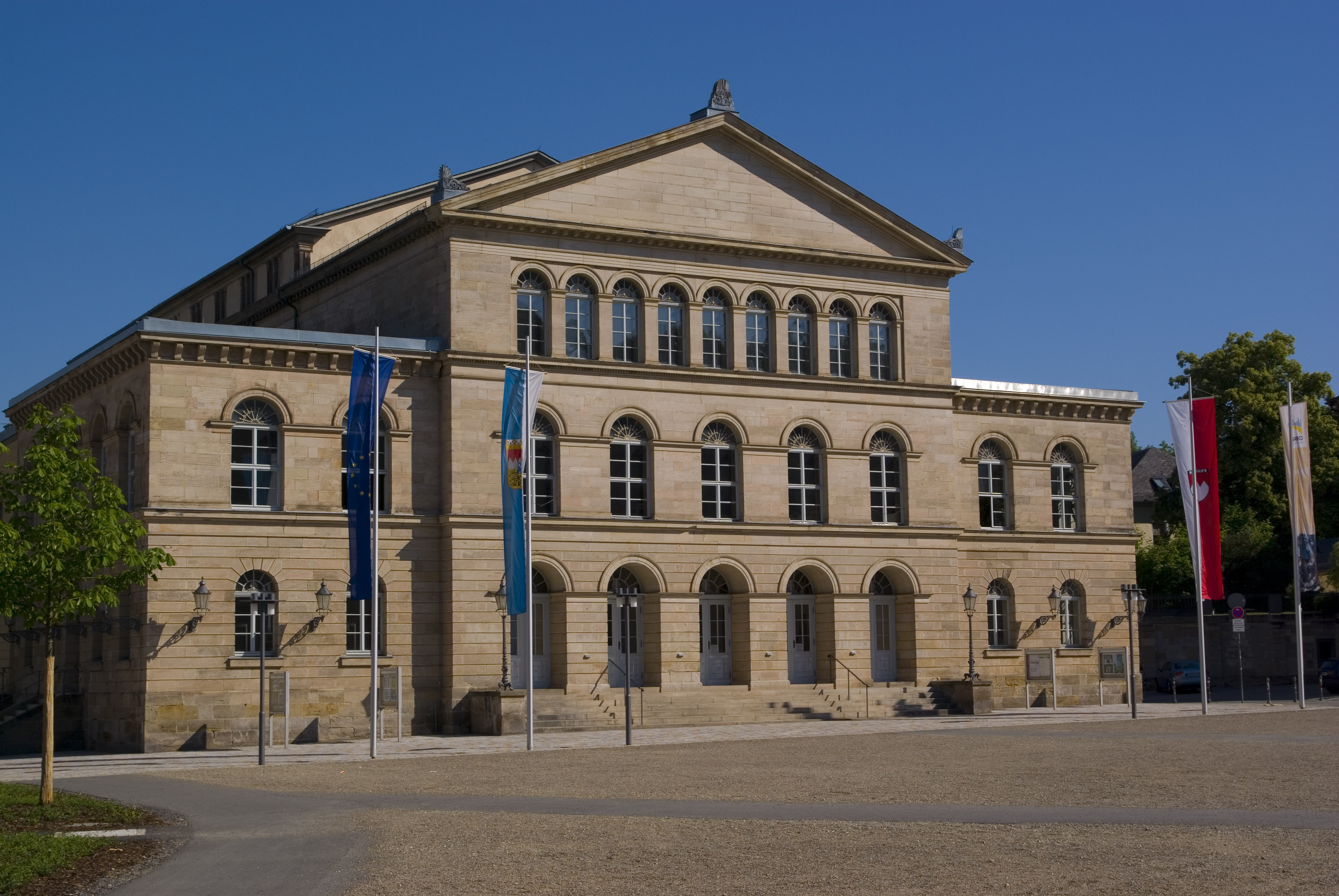
- Front facade of the Landestheater Coburg

- Location in Bavaria
- Former names: Herzoglich Sächsisches Hoftheater zu Coburg, Theater in Coburg
- Address: Schlossplatz 6, Coburg
- Coordinates: 50°15′35″N 10°58′1″E
- Capacity: 550

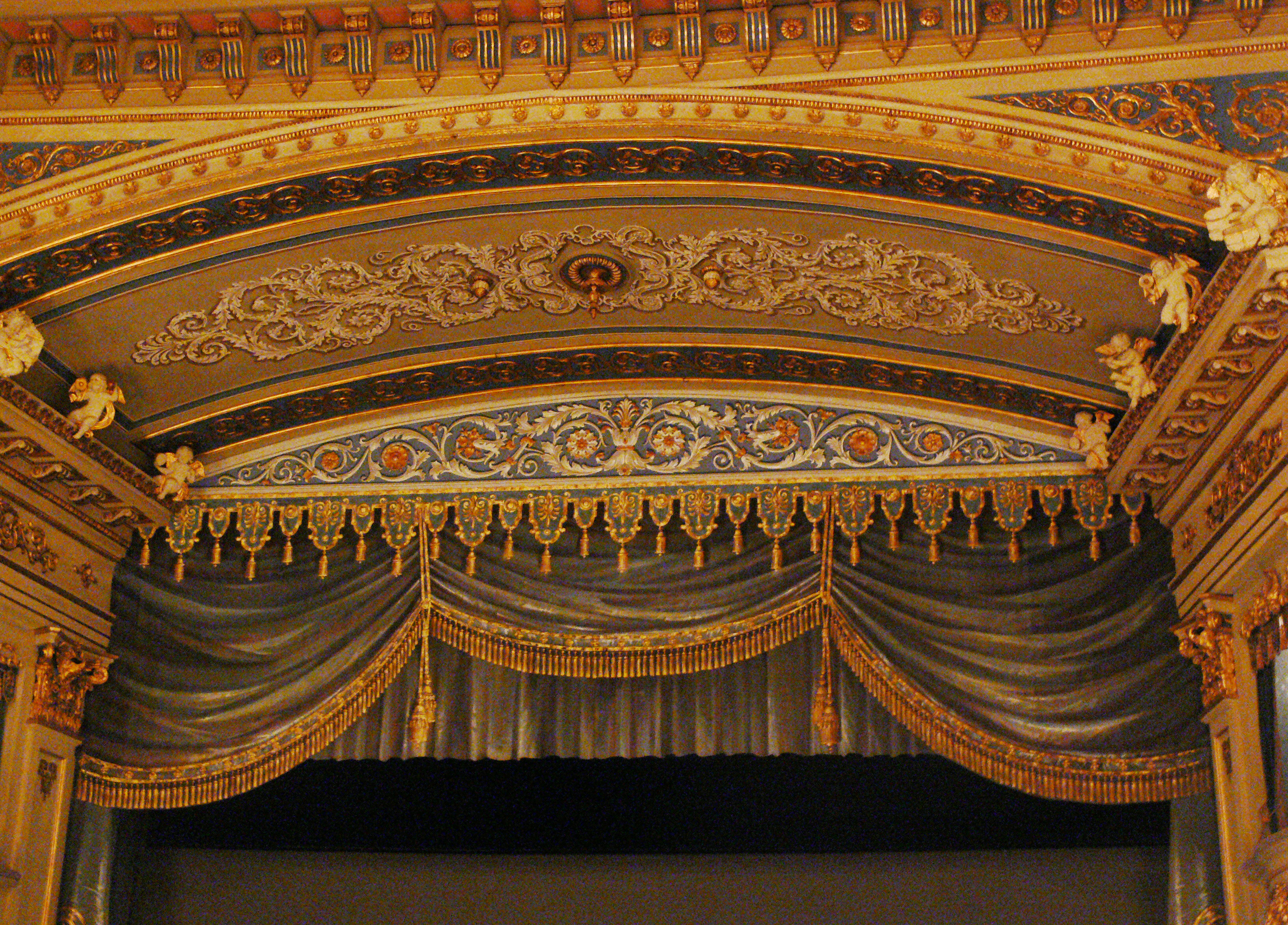
Proscenium

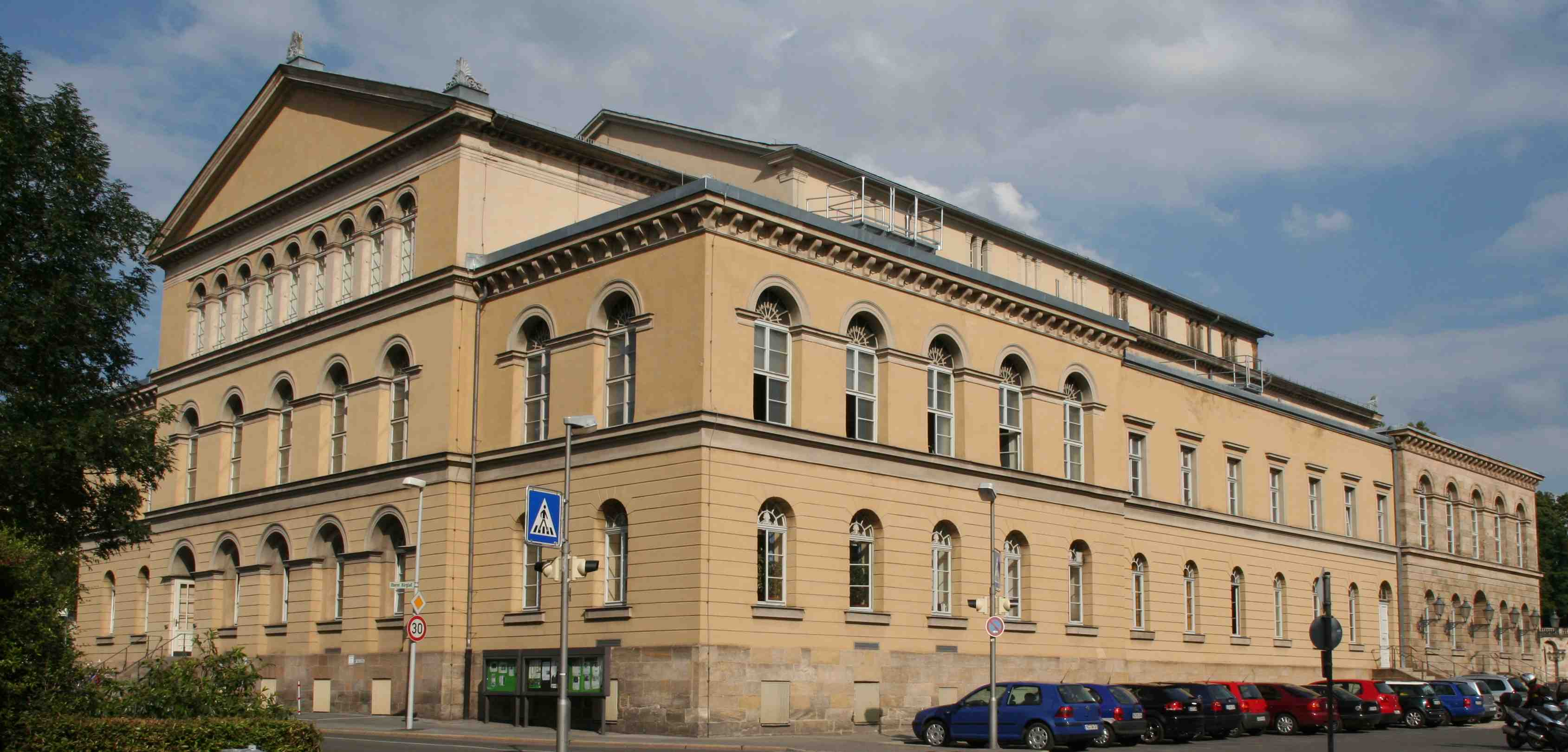
Side facade

Landestheater Coburg (Coburg State Theatre) is a medium-sized three-division (opera / operetta, drama, ballet) theatre in Coburg, Bavaria, Germany. Located on Schlossplatz, a central square, the Neoclassical building has 550 seats. In 2008, the theatre employed 250 permanent staff and 100 part-time employees.

== History ==
Like in many other princely residence towns, the roots of Coburg's theatre lie with the local ruling family. In the 16th century, amateur plays were staged in honour of the ducal family, mostly by students at the Casimirianum. Duke Albrecht, inspired by his wife Marie Elisabeth established a theatre hall in the Zeughaus (armoury) building. In 1764, Duke Ernst Friedrich established another theatre, in the former Ballhaus (today the location of the Arkaden), but no continuous stage work ensued. Only in 1827, when Duke Ernst I founded the Herzoglich-Sächsisches Hoftheater (ducal Saxon court theatre) was a permanent theatrical ensemble hired. The location was still the Ballhaus which soon turned out to be insufficient. Thus a new building was erected on Schlossplatz across from Ehrenburg Palace. The new edifice was opened on 17 September 1840.

With the end of the monarchy in 1918, Karl Eduard transferred the property to the Landesstiftung Coburg in 1919. The foundation worked with the town of Coburg to operate the venue, renamed Landestheater. When Coburg became part of Bavaria in 1920, the Bavarian state took the place of the foundation.

The town continues to operate the theatre, but the Bavarian government remains the owner and carries most of the financial burden.

== Intendants ==
- Kurt Erlich (1955–1966)
- Tebbe Harms Kleen (1978–1988)
- Ernö Weil (1988–1995)
- Karin Heindl-Lau (1995–1996)
- Reinhold Röttger (1996–1997)
- Norbert Kleine-Borgmann (1997–2001)
- Dieter Gackstetter (2001–2007)
- Detlef Altenbeck (2008–2010)
- Bodo Busse (2010–2017)
- Bernhard F. Loges (2018–2023)
- Neil Barry Moss (2024–)

== General music directors ==
- Albert Bing
- Alfred Ottokar Lorenz (1917–1920)
- Kurt Schröder
- Wilhelm Schönherr (1939–1945)
- Walter Stoschek (1945–1949)
- Helmut Pape
- Reinhard Petersen (1976–1980)
- Paul Theissen (1980–1988)
- Christian Fröhlich (1988–1995)
- Hiroshi Kodama (1996–2001)
- Alois Seidlmeier (2002–2010)
- Roland Kluttig (2010–2020)
- Daniel Carter (2021–2026)
- Tommaso Turchetta (2026–)
