= Heinrich Strecker =

Austrian composer

Heinrich Strecker (24 February 1893, Vienna - 28 June 1981, Baden bei Wien) was an Austrian composer of operettas and popular Viennese music.

== Biography ==
As a young child, Strecker was sent to Theux in Belgium, where he was educated on a boarding school run by Lazarists. His talent for music was noticed here, and his interest nurtured. At the completion of his schooling, he could play 12 instruments. He professed a preference for the violin, in which he completed a masterclass. In 1907, Strecker made his public performance debut with his own composition, Violin Concerto in A Major, and in the same year, he was asked to play it for the Belgian king Leopold II, and was honoured for doing so.

He returned to Vienna in 1910, at the age of 17, to study law at the University of Vienna. His studies were interrupted by the First World War, in which he was an army officer. After the war he devoted himself solely to his music, studying with Prof. Camillo Horn and beginning to compose classical pieces.

Between commissioned pieces, such as dance and film music, he discovered Viennese songs. He became famous for this type of popular music, as well as for his Singspiel. He often collaborated with F. Gerold, Joe Grebitz and Bruno Hardt-Warden, who wrote the song texts and libretti.

On 21 December 1931, his operetta "Mädel aus Wien" (Girl from Vienna) premiered at the Vienna Bürgertheater, and immediately following the Anschluss of Austria by the Third Reich, his operetta "Der ewige Walzer" (The Eternal Waltz) premiered on 18 May 1938 at the Volksoper. His Singspiel Ännchen von Tharau (Little Ann from Tharau), which he wrote with Hardt-Warden, premiered at the Raimund Theater on 8 February 1940.

Strecker became a member of the Nazi Party in 1933, and was the regional representative of the cultural community of Vienna. In addition to the "Excelsior" and "Stage" publishers, which he founded in Vienna in 1926, he took over the "Bristol, Sirius and Europaton" music publishers under the guise of Aryanisation.

Strecker was married to Erika Strecker, and died at the age of 88 in Baden on 28 June 1981.

During his career he composed many popular songs, waltzes, marches, operettas, and film scores. His music is still popular in Austria, and concerts are sometimes given in his old home in the Viennese suburb of Baden bei Wien.

== Selected works ==
The complete catalogue of Heinrich Strecker's works comprises more than 350 individual pieces.

=== Stage works ===
- Mädel aus Wien, operetta (1931)
- Ännchen von Tharau, Singspiel in 3 acts (1933)
- Der ewige Walzer, operetta (1937)
- Honeymoon, operetta

=== Viennese songs ===
- Drunt in der Lobau
- Ja, ja der Wein ist gut
- Auf der Lahmgrub'n da steht ein altes Haus
- Grüß mir die Stadt der Lieder
- An der blauen Donau
- Wann a Weana Musi spielt
- Das war in Petersdorf

== See also ==
- Wienerlied
