= Brose Fahrzeugteile =

German automotive supplier

Brose Fahrzeugteile SE & Co. KG
- Industry: Automotive industry
- Founded: 4 March 1908; 118 years ago in Berlin, Germany
- Founder: Max Brose
- Headquarters: Coburg, Germany
- Number of locations: 62 (2018)
- Key people: Chairman: Michael Stoschek; Management: Stefan Krug, CEO
- Products: Vehicle parts: Technology for vehicle doors and liftgates, Adjustment systems for front and rear seats, Electric motors and drives
- Revenue: 7.7 billion Euro (2024)
- Number of employees: 31,000 (2025)
- Website: brose.com
- Footnotes; Latest version 2017-11-29

Brose Fahrzeugteile SE & Co. KG is an automotive supplier. The family-owned company is headquartered in Coburg, Germany.

In 2018, the Brose Group developed and produced mechatronic components and systems for vehicle doors, seats and body at 62 locations in 23 countries. Brose's customers include over 80 car manufacturers and other automotive suppliers. By 2017, More than 26,000 people were employed worldwide by the family-owned company. The Brose Group generated sales of €7.7 billion in fiscal 2024. The company is also the primary sponsor of and majority owner of Brose Bamberg basketball club.

== History ==
=== 1908–1955 ===
Max Brose opened a trading company for automobile accessories in Berlin on 4 March 1908, while also working as general agent for his father's car body manufacturing company in Wuppertal.

After the First World War, Max Brose and Ernst Jühling, who grew up in Coburg, founded Metallwerk Max Brose & Co. in Coburg on 14 June 1919.

The company founder, Max Brose joined the Nazi Party and the National Socialist Motor Corps in 1933. During World War II, Brose's company produced goods for the Nazi military, producing gasoline canisters and armaments for the Nazi military. The company also used forced labor during the war, including prisoners of war. While the company and family claim Brose was a non-ideological member who treated laborers well, this claim has not been substantiated. A company-commissioned book from 2008 presented a view of Brose as a non-ideological party member who treated forced laborers well, but this has been contested by scholars and journalists. After the war, Brose was classified as a "follower" in a denazification hearing.

=== 2000–2015 ===
In April 2008, Brose added electric drives for window regulators, sunroof and seat belt retractors to its portfolio by purchasing the electric motor business of Continental AG. In setting up the drives business division, the number of employees increased from nearly 10,000 to more than 14,000. Since then, the company has been divided into three business divisions: Seat, Door and Drives.

In 2011 Brose is the world's fifth-largest family-owned automotive supplier based on turnover. 10% of the total annually business volume is invested in the development of new products and processes with a focus on the development of products that contribute to fuel efficiency.

In April 2013, Brose received its first Pace Award for the sensor for hands-free opening of liftgates; Due to the increasing electrification and digitisation of vehicles, Brose invested in a test centre in Würzburg to measure electromagnetic compatibility.

In January 2020, the former Brose Fahrzeugteile GmbH & Co. KG was changed from a GmbH into a Societas Europaea named Brose Fahrzeugteile SE & Co. KG.

== Awards ==
2013

- Automotive Innovations Award, Category "Car Body and Exterior"
- Pace Award for the touch-free liftgate drive

2012

- BBAC Excellent Supplier Award, Daimler Supplier Award

2011

- BMW "Supplier Innovation Award" for the touch-free liftgate drive

2008

- Bavarian Quality Prize

2007

- Automotive Lean Production Award

== Awards for Human Resources Activities ==
2014

- Focus national survey: Brose is one of Germany's top employers
- Top Employers Automotive 2014: Brose achieved third place in the overall standings

2013

- Career's Best Recruiters Study 2012/2013: Brose second in the industry ranking
- Universum Student Survey 2013, Brose is "Top climber of the year"

2012

- Top Employer Automotive 2012/13: Brose among the top 10
- Innovation Prize of the "Success Factor Family" company competition
