= List of Christian monasteries in Bavaria =

This is a list of Christian religious houses of both men and women, dissolved and extant, in Bavaria, Germany.

Monastic house	Location	Order	Status	Notes
Abenberg Abbey; Kloster Abenberg	Abenberg	Benedictine monks, founded and dissolved 12th century	dissolved	
Venio Abbey; Abtei Venio (in full: Abtei Venio von der Verklärung des Herrn)	Nymphenburg	Benedictine nuns, founded 1926/27 as priory; raised to abbey in 2013	extant	Transfiguration of the Lord
Altomünster Abbey; Kloster Altomünster	Altomünster	Benedictine monks until 1056 (relocated to Weingarten Abbey); Benedictine nuns (relocated from Altdorf) 1056–1488; Bridgettine double monastery 1496–1803, nuns 1841–2017	dissolved	Saint Alto and Saint Bridget
Amorbach Abbey; Kloster Amorbach	Amorbach	Benedictine monks	dissolved	Saint Mary; also Saints Simplicius, Faustinus and Beatrix
Andechs Abbey; Kloster Andechs	Andechs	Austin Canons 1416–1455; Benedictine monks 1455–1803 and from 1850	extant	pilgrimage church
St Gumbert's Abbey; Kloster St. Gumbert	Ansbach	Benedictine monks; collegiate church	dissolved	Saint Mary, the Holy Saviour and Saint Gumbert of Ansbach
Asbach Abbey; Kloster Asbach	Asbach in Rotthalmünster	Benedictine monks	dissolved	
Attel Abbey; Kloster Attel	Attel in Wasserburg am Inn	Benedictine monks; Barmherzige Brüder	dissolved	Saint Michael
Au am Inn Priory; Kloster Au am Inn	Au am Inn in Gars am Inn	Benedictine monks; Austin Canons; Franciscan Sisters of Dillingen	dissolved	
Aufhausen Priory; Kloster Aufhausen	Aufhausen	Oratorians of Saint Philip Neri, Benedictine monks, Brothers of the Holy Blood, Oratorians of Saint Philip Neri, Geistliche Familie vom Heiligen Blut	extant	Our Lady of the Snows
St. Stephen's Abbey, Augsburg; Kloster St. Stephan, Augsburg	Augsburg	nuns (possibly Benedictine), Augustinian canonesses, secular canonesses (Damenstift), Benedictine monks	extant	Saint Stephen
Abbey of Saints Ulrich and Afra; Kloster St. Ulrich und Afra, Augsburg	Augsburg	Benedictine monks	dissolved	Saint Ulrich and Saint Afra
Benedictine nunnery, Augsburg; Benediktinerinnenkloster Augsburg	Augsburg	Benedictine nuns	dissolved	Saint Nicholas
Auhausen Abbey; Kloster Auhausen	Auhausen	Benedictine monks	dissolved	Saint Mary, Saint Godehard and Saint George
Aura Abbey; Kloster Aura	Aura an der Saale	Benedictine monks	dissolved	
St Zeno's Abbey; Kloster St. Zeno (Bad Reichenhall)	Bad Reichenhall	Benedictine monks	dissolved	Saint Zeno
St Faith's Provostry, Bamberg; Propstei St. Getreu	Bamberg	Benedictine monks	dissolved	Saint Faith
Carmelite friary, Bamberg; Karmelitenkloster Bamberg	Bamberg	Cistercian nuns, Damenstift following the Benedictine rule, Carmelite friars	dissolved	Saint Mary and Saint Theodore
Banz Abbey; Kloster Banz	Bad Staffelstein	Benedictine monks	dissolved	
Benediktbeuern Abbey; Kloster Benediktbeuern	Benediktbeuern	Benedictine monks, Benedictine nuns	dissolved	
Berg im Donaugau Abbey; Kloster Berg im Donaugau	Berg im Gau or environs	Benedictine monks	founded c.768; apparently destroyed in the 10th century	
Bergen Abbey; Kloster Bergen (Neuburg)	Bergen bei Neuburg	Benedictine nuns	dissolved	
Bernried Abbey; Kloster Bernried	Bernried am Starnberger See	Austin Canons 1121–1803; Benedictine nuns (Missionary Benedictine Sisters of Tutzing) from 1949	extant	Saint Martin
Biburg Abbey; Kloster Biburg	Biburg	Benedictine monks; Benedictine nuns	dissolved	Virgin Mary
Chammünster Abbey; Kloster Chammünster	Cham	Benedictine monks	founded 738; destroyed in the early 10th century	
Provostry of Saints Peter and Paul, Coburg; Kloster Sankt Peter und Paul (Coburg)	Coburg	Benedictine monks	dissolved	Saints Peter and Paul
St Alban Priory; Kloster St. Alban (Dießen am Ammersee)	Sankt Alban in Diessen am Ammersee	Benedictine nuns	extant; founded 1923	
Abbey of the Sacred Heart, Donauwörth; Kloster Heilig Kreuz (Donauwörth)	Donauwörth	Benedictine nuns; Benedictine monks until 1803; Missionaries of the Sacred Heart from 1935	extant	
Ebersberg Abbey; Kloster Ebersberg	Ebersberg	Austin Canons 934–1013; Benedictine monks 1013–1595; Jesuits 1595–1773; Knights Hospitallers 1773–1807	dissolved	Saint Mary and Saint Sebastian
Echenbrunn Abbey; Kloster Echenbrunn	Gundelfingen an der Donau	Benedictine monks 1122–1556; Jesuits; Hospitallers	dissolved	
Scots Monastery, Eichstätt; Schottenkloster Eichstätt	Eichstätt	Benedictine monks; Capuchin friars; Passionist Brothers from 2012	extant	
Elchingen Abbey; Kloster Elchingen	Elchingen	Benedictine monks until 1803; Missionary Oblates of Mary Immaculate from 1921	extant	Virgin Mary and Saints Peter and Paul
Ensdorf Abbey; Kloster Ensdorf	Ensdorf	Benedictine monks 1121–1556 and 1669–1802; Salesians of Don Bosco from 1920	extant	Saint James
Ettal Abbey; Kloster Ettal	Ettal	Benedictine monks 1330–1803; re-founded 1900	extant	Assumption of the Virgin Mary
Fährbrück Priory; Augustinerkloster Fährbrück	Hausen bei Würzburg	Benedictine monks until 1414; Redemptorists; Augustinians from 1880	dissolved	pilgrimage destination from 12th century; later monastery founded 1867, closed 2023
Feuchtwangen Abbey, later Stift Feuchtwangen; Kloster Unserer Lieben Frau zu Feuchtwangen	Feuchtwangen	Benedictine monks; Canons Regular	dissolved	
Frauenchiemsee Abbey aka Frauenwörth Abbey; Kloster Frauenchiemsee	Frauenchiemsee	Benedictine nuns	extant	
Frauenzell Abbey; Kloster Frauenzell	Brennberg	Benedictine monks	dissolved	
St Vitus' Abbey, Freising, later Stift Freising; St. Veit (Freising)	Freising	Benedictine monks; collegiate church	dissolved	Saint Vitus
Freising Cathedral Chapter; Domkloster Freising	Freising	Benedictine monks	dissolved	Saint Benedict; attached to Freising Cathedral
Fultenbach Abbey; Kloster Fultenbach	Holzheim, Dillingen	Benedictine monks	dissolved	
St. Mang's Abbey, Füssen; Kloster St. Mang	Füssen	Benedictine monks	dissolved	
Gars Abbey; Kloster Gars	Gars am Inn	Benedictine monks; Austin Canons until 1803; Redemptorists from 1858	dissolved	
Geisenfeld Abbey; Kloster Geisenfeld	Geisenfeld	Benedictine nuns	dissolved	
Grab Provostry; Propstei Grab	Sulzbürg in Mühlhausen	Benedictine monks	dissolved	
Gunzenhausen Abbey; Kloster Gunzenhausen	Gunzenhausen	Benedictine monks (documented in 823)	dissolved	
Heidenheim Abbey; Kloster Heidenheim	Heidenheim	founded 752 for Benedictine monks and nuns in double monastery; from 790 a college of secular canons; 1155–1537 Benedictine monks	dissolved	
Abbey of the Holy Cross, Donauwörth; Kloster Heilig Kreuz (Donauwörth)	Donauwörth	Benedictine nuns	dissolved	
Herrenchiemsee Abbey; Kloster Herrenchiemsee	Herrenchiemsee	Benedictine monks	dissolved	
Herrieden Abbey; Stift Herrieden; Kollegiatstift Herrieden	Herrieden	Benedictine monks; college of secular canons	dissolved	Saint Vitus
Hohenwart Abbey; Kloster Hohenwart	Hohenwart	Benedictine nuns	dissolved	
Holzen Abbey; Kloster Holzen	Allmannshofen	Benedictine nuns	dissolved	
Holzkirchen Priory; Kloster Holzkirchen	Holzkirchen	Benedictine monks until 1552; briefly revived in early 17th century until 1631	dissolved	
Ilmmünster Abbey; Kloster Ilmmünster	Ilmmünster	Benedictine monks; secular canons	dissolved	Saint Arsatius
Irsee Abbey; Kloster Irsee	Irsee	Benedictine monks until 12th century; secular canons	dissolved	
Isen Abbey, later Isen Provostry; Kloster St. Zeno (Isen)	Isen	Benedictine monks until 12th century; secular canons	dissolved	Saint Zeno
Kastl Abbey; Kloster Kastl	Kastl	Benedictine monks until 1625; Jesuits from 1636; Hospitallers 1773–1803	dissolved	Saint Peter
Kempten Abbey; Fürststift Kempten	Kempten	Benedictine monks	dissolved	
Kitzingen Abbey; Benediktinerinnenkloster Kitzingen	Kitzingen	Benedictine nuns until 1544; Damenstift; Ursulines 1660–1804	dissolved	
Kochel Abbey; Kloster Kochel	Kochel	Benedictine nuns c. 740–10th century	dissolved	
Kühbach Abbey; Kloster Kühbach	Kühbach	Benedictine nuns	dissolved	
Saint Peter's Abbey on the Madron; Kloster Sankt Peter am Madron	Flintsbach	Benedictine monks	dissolved	Saint Peter
Mallersdorf Abbey; Kloster Mallersdorf	Mallersdorf-Pfaffenberg	Benedictine monks; Benedictine nuns	dissolved	
Priory of Maria Eck; Kloster Maria Eck	Siegsdorf	Benedictine monks 17th century–1803; Minorites from 1891	extant	pilgrimage church from 16th century
Abbey of Maria Frieden (Peace of Mary); Abtei Maria Frieden (Kirchschletten)	Kirchschletten in Zapfendorf	Benedictine nuns from 1953	extant	
Megingaudshausen Abbey; Kloster Megingaudshausen	Landkreis Neustadt an der Aisch-Bad Windsheim	Benedictine monks, menioned in a deed of 816	dissolved	site lost
Scots Monastery, Memmingen otherwise Memmingen Abbey; Schottenkloster Memmingen	Memmingen	Benedictine monks	dissolved	Saint Nicholas
Metten Abbey; Kloster Metten	Metten	Benedictine monks	extant	Saint Michael
Michaelsberg Abbey, Bamberg; Kloster Michelsberg	Bamberg	Benedictine monks	dissolved	Saint Michael
Mönchröden Abbey; Kloster Mönchröden	Rödental	Benedictine monks until 1531	dissolved	
Mönchsdeggingen Abbey; Kloster Mönchsdeggingen	Mönchsdeggingen	Benedictine monks until 1802; Congregation of the Missionaries of Mariannhill 1950–2017	dissolved	Saint Martin
Mönchsroth Abbey; Kloster Mönchsroth	Mönchsroth	Benedictine monks until 1558	dissolved	Saints Peter and Paul
Monheim Abbey; Kloster Monheim	Monheim	Benedictine nuns until 1533 or 1548	dissolved	Saint Walburga
Moosburg Abbey aka Stift St Castulus; Kloster Moosburg	Moosburg an der Isar	Benedictine monks	dissolved	Saint Castulus
Münchaurach Abbey; Kloster Münchaurach	Münchaurach in Aurachtal	Benedictine monks until 1532	dissolved	Saint Peter
Münchsmünster Abbey; Kloster Münchsmünster	Münchsmünster	Benedictine monks until 1556; Jesuits until 1773; Knights Hospitallers until 1813	dissolved	Saint Peter and Saint Sixtus
Münchsteinach Abbey; Kloster Münchsteinach	Münchsteinach	Benedictine monks until 1528/1529	dissolved	Saint Nicholas
St. Boniface's Abbey, Munich; Abtei St. Bonifaz (München)	Munich, Maxvorstadt	Benedictine monks	extant	Saint Boniface
Münsterschwarzach Abbey; Abtei Münsterschwarzach	Schwarzach am Main	Benedictine nuns until 877 (see Münsterschwarzach Nunnery); Benedictine monks 877–1803; Missionary Benedictines (Ottilien Congregation) from 1913	extant	
Münsterschwarzach Nunnery aka Frauenschwarzach Abbey; Frauenkloster Münsterschwarzach	Schwarzach am Main	Benedictine nuns, probably founded 2nd half of the 8th century; transferred to Benedictine monks 877	dissolved	
Neuburg Abbey; Benediktinerinnenkloster (Neuburg an der Donau)	Neuburg an der Donau	Benedictine nuns; Jesuits; Knights Hospitallers	dissolved	
St. Vitus' Abbey on the Rott; Kloster Sankt Veit	Neumarkt-Sankt Veit	Benedictine monks	dissolved	Saint Vitus
Neustadt am Main Abbey; Benediktinerabtei Neustadt am Main	Neustadt am Main	Benedictine monks until 1803; Dominican Sisters from 1907 (see Neustadt an Main Convent)	dissolved	
Neustadt am Main Convent; Dominikanerinnenkloster Neustadt am Main	Neustadt am Main	Dominican Sisters of St. Catherine of Siena from 1907 (in premises of former Neustadt an Main Abbey)	extant	Saint Catherine of Siena
Niederaltaich Abbey; Abtei Niederaltaich	Niederaltaich	Benedictine monks	extant	
Niedernburg Abbey; Kloster Niedernburg	Passau	secular canonesses (Frauenstift) from c.772; Benedictine nuns to 1806; Congregation of Jesus (Englische Fräulein) 1836–2017	dissolved	
St Giles' Abbey, Nuremberg aka Scots Monastery, Nuremberg; Egidienkloster Nürnberg	Nuremberg	Benedictine monks until 1525	dissolved	Saint Giles
Oberalteich Abbey; Kloster Oberalteich	Oberalteich in Bogen	Benedictine monks until 1803	dissolved	Saints Peter and Paul
St. Ottilien Archabbey; Erzabtei Sankt Ottilien	Emming in Eresing	Benedictine monks (Missionary Benedictines) from 1887; archabbey from 1914	extant	Saint Ottilia
Ottobeuren Abbey; Kloster Ottobeuren	Ottobeuren	Benedictine monks	extant	
Provostry of St. Michael, Paring; Kloster Paring	Langquaid	Canons Regular unti 1598; Benedictine monks 1616–1803; Congregation of Windesheim from 1974	dissolved	Saint Michael
Petersberg Abbey; Basilica of Saints Peter and Paul; St. Peter und Paul (Petersberg)	Petersberg in Erdweg	Benedictine monks, relocating from Fischbachau, 1104–1119; they relocated once more to Scheyern Abbey but the abbey church at Petersberg remained as the present basilica	dissolved	Saints Peter and Paul
Pfaffenmünster Abbey; Kloster Pfaffenmünster	Münster in Steinach	Benedictine monks (probably), 8th-10th centuries; secular canons, relocated from Metten, 1157–1803	dissolved	Saint Tiburtius
Plankstetten Abbey; Kloster Plankstetten	Plankstetten in Berching	Benedictine monks	extant	
Polling Abbey; Kloster Polling	Polling bei Weilheim	Benedictine monks	dissolved	
Prüfening Abbey; Kloster Prüfening	Regensburg	Benedictine monks	dissolved	
Prüll Charterhouse, formerly Prüll Abbey; Kloster Prüll, Kartause Prüll	Regensburg	Benedictine monks 997–1474; Carthusian monks 1484–1803	dissolved	Saint Vitus
Mittelmünster Abbey; Kloster Mittelmünster (Regensburg)	Regensburg	Benedictine nuns, founded 983; formally converted to Stift of secular canonesses 1484; dissolved 1588	dissolved	Saint Paul
St Peter's Abbey, Regensburg; Kloster St. Peter (Regensburg)	Regensburg	Benedictine monks c.1070–1552	dissolved	Saint Peter
Scots Monastery, Regensburg; Schottenkloster St. Jakob (Regensburg)	Regensburg	Benedictine monks	dissolved	Saint James
Reichenbach Abbey; Kloster Reichenbach am Regen	Reichenbach am Regen	Benedictine monks	dissolved	
Reistingen Abbey; Kloster Reistingen	Reistingen in Ziertheim	Benedictine monks	dissolved	
Rinchnach Priory; Kloster Rinchnach	Rinchnach	Benedictine monks	dissolved	
Rott Abbey; Kloster Rott	Rott am Inn	Benedictine monks	dissolved	
Rohr Abbey, later Braunau in Rohr Abbey; Kloster Rohr (Niederbayern)	Rohr in Niederbayern	Austin Canons; Benedictine monks	extant	
Sandau Abbey; Kloster Sandau	Landsberg am Lech	Benedictine monks	dissolved	
Saint Emmeram's Abbey; Kloster Sankt Emmeram	Regensburg	Benedictine monks	dissolved	Saint Emmeram
Schottenkloster Regensburg aka Jakobskloster / St James's Abbey, Regensburg	Regensburg	Benedictine monks	dissolved	Saint James
Sankt Oswald Abbey; Kloster Sankt Oswald	Sankt Oswald-Riedlhütte	Benedictine monks	dissolved	Saint Oswald
St Alban's Abbey; Kloster St. Alban (Dießen am Ammersee)	Dießen am Ammersee	Benedictine nuns	extant	Saint Alban
St Walburga's Abbey; Kloster St. Walburg	Eichstätt	Benedictine nuns	extant	Saint Walburga
Schäftlarn Abbey; Kloster Schäftlarn	Schäftlarn	Benedictine monks	extant	
Scharnitz Abbey; Kloster Scharnitz	Mittenwald	Benedictine monks	dissolved	
Scheyern Abbey; Kloster Scheyern	Scheyern	Benedictine monks	extant	
Schlehdorf Abbey; Kloster Schlehdorf	Schlehdorf	Benedictine monks	dissolved	
Schliersee Abbey; Kloster Schliersee	Schliersee	Benedictine monks	dissolved	
Schmerlenbach Abbey; Kloster Schmerlenbach	Winzenhohl in Hösbach	Benedictine nuns; Cistercian nuns	dissolved	
Schönrain Priory; Kloster Schönrain	Gemünden am Main	Benedictine monks	dissolved	
Schweiklberg Abbey; Abtei Schweiklberg	Vilshofen an der Donau	Benedictine monks	extant	
Schweinfurt Abbey; Benediktinerkloster Schweinfurt	Schweinfurt	Benedictine monks; Teutonic Order	dissolved	
Seeon Abbey; Kloster Seeon	Seeon-Seebruck	Benedictine monks	dissolved	
Seiferstetten Abbey; Kloster Seiferstetten	Landsberg am Lech	Benedictine monks	dissolved	
Solnhofen Abbey; Kloster Solnhofen	Solnhofen	Benedictine monks	dissolved	
Staffelsee Abbey; Kloster Staffelsee	Wörth island in Seehausen am Staffelsee	Benedictine monks	dissolved	
Tegernbach Abbey; Kloster Tegernbach	Tegernbach in Dorfen	Benedictine monks	dissolved	
Tegernsee Abbey; Kloster Tegernsee	Tegernsee	Benedictine monks	dissolved	
Tettenweis Abbey aka St Gertrud's Abbey, formerly Priory; Kloster Tettenweis	Tettenweis	Benedictine nuns, founded 1899; raised to abbey in 1924	extant	Saint Gertrude
Theres Abbey; Kloster Theres	Theres	Benedictine monks	dissolved	
Thierhaupten Abbey; Kloster Thierhaupten	Thierhaupten	Benedictine monks	dissolved	
Thulba Abbey; Kloster Thulba	Oberthulba	Benedictine nuns	dissolved	
Unterliezheim Abbey; Kloster Unterliezheim	Unterliezheim in Lutzingen	Benedictine nuns	dissolved	
Vornbach Abbey; Kloster Vornbach	Neuhaus am Inn	Benedictine monks	dissolved	Virgin Mary and Saint Benedict
Weihenstephan Abbey; Kloster Weihenstephan	Weihenstephan	Benedictine monks; Benedictine nuns	dissolved	Saint Stephen
Weissenohe Abbey; Kloster Weißenohe	Weissenohe	Benedictine monks	dissolved	
Weltenburg Abbey; Kloster Weltenburg	Weltenburg in Kelheim	Benedictine monks	extant	
Wessobrunn Abbey; Kloster Wessobrunn	Wessobrunn	Benedictine monks; Benedictine nuns	dissolved	Saints Peter and Paul
St Ludwig's Priory, Wipfeld; St. Ludwig (Wipfeld)	Wipfeld	Benedictine monks 1901–1913 (moved to Münsterschwarzach); Dienerinnen der heiligen Kindheit Jesu from 1965	extant	Saint Louis; the Holy Family
Wülzburg Abbey; Kloster Wülzburg	Wülzburg	Benedictine monks	dissolved	Saints Peter and Paul
St. Burchard's Abbey, Würzburg; St. Burkard (Würzburg)	Würzburg	Benedictine monks	dissolved	Saint Burchard; originally dedicated to Saints Andrew, Mary and Magnus
St. James's Abbey, Würzburg; Schottenkloster Würzburg	Würzburg	Benedictine monks	dissolved	Saint James
St. Kilian's Abbey, Würzburg; St. Kilian (Würzburg)	Würzburg	Benedictine monks	dissolved	Saint Kilian; Holy Redeemer; attached to Würzburg Cathedral
St. Stephen's Abbey, Würzburg; St. Stephan (Würzburg)	Würzburg	Benedictine monks; Benedictine nuns	dissolved	Saint Stephen
Aldersbach Abbey; Kloster Aldersbach	Aldersbach	Augustinian Canons c. 1120-1146; Cistercian monks 1146-1803	dissolved	Saint Peter; Our Lady (from 1146)
Bildhauen Abbey; Kloster Bildhausen, also Maria Bildhausen	Münnerstadt	Cistercian monks 1156-1803	dissolved	Saint Bilihildis of Altmünster
Birkenfeld Abbey; Kloster Birkenfeld	Birkenfeld in Neustadt an der Aisch	Cistercian nuns 1275-1545	dissolved	Virgin Mary
Ebrach Abbey; Kloster Ebrach	Ebrach	Cistercian monks	dissolved	Virgin Mary, Saint John the Evangelist and Saint Nicholas
Frauenroth Abbey; Kloster Frauenroth	Burkardroth	Cistercian nuns	dissolved	Saint George and All Saints
Fürstenfeld Abbey; Kloster Fürstenfeld	Fürstenfeldbruck	Cistercian monks 1258-1803	dissolved	Assumption of the Virgin Mary
Fürstenzell Abbey; Kloster Fürstenzell	Fürstenzell	Cistercian monks 1274-1803	dissolved	Saint Laurence; Virgin Mary
Gotteszell Abbey; Kloster Gotteszell	Gotteszell	Cistercian monks 1285-1803	dissolved	Virgin Mary and Saint Anne
Heiligenthal Abbey; Kloster Heiligenthal	Heiligenthal in Schwanfeld	Cistercian nuns 1234-1579	dissolved	the former abbey church is dedicated to Saint Mark
Heilsbronn Abbey; Kloster Heilsbronn	Heilsbronn	Cistercian monks 1123-1631	dissolved	ceased to be Catholic in 1555; the last 5 abbots were Protestant
Himmelkron Abbey; Kloster Himmelkron	Himmelkron	Cistercian nuns 1279-1569	dissolved	
Himmelspforten Abbey; Kloster Himmelspforten	Zellerau in Würzburg	Cistercian nuns 1231-1803; Discalced Carmelite Sisters 1944-	extant	Virgin Mary, Saint John the Evangelist and Saint Nicholas; Assumption of the Virgin Mary
Himmelthal Abbey; Kloster Himmelthal	Elsenfeld	Cistercian nuns 1232-1568	dissolved	
Himmelthron Abbey; Kloster Himmelthron	Großgründlach in Nuremberg	Cistercian nuns	dissolved	Virgin Mary
Kaisheim Abbey otherwise Kaisersheim Abbey; Kloster Kaisheim or Kaisersheim	Kaisheim	Cistercian monks 1153 or 1155-1802	dissolved	Assumption of the Virgin Mary (church); Reichsstift from 1757
Langheim Abbey; Kloster Langheim	Klosterlangheim in Lichtenfels	Cistercian monks	dissolved	
Saint Agnes' Abbey; Kloster Sankt Agnes	Lauingen	Cistercian nuns 1270-1803	dissolved	Saint Agnes
Kreuztal Abbey, also Mariaburghausen Abbey; Kloster Kreuztal	Mariaburghausen in Haßfurt	Cistercian nuns 1243-1582	dissolved	Virgin Mary
Maidbronn Abbey; Kloster Maidbronn	Maidbronn	Cistercian nuns 1232-1581	dissolved	Virgin Mary or Saint Afra
Niederschönenfeld Abbey; Kloster Niederschönenfeld	Niederschönenfeld	Cistercian nuns 1241-1803	dissolved	
Oberschönenfeld Abbey aka Oberschönenfeld Priory; Kloster Oberschönenfeld	Gessertshausen	Beguines - late 12th /early 13th century; Cistercian nuns 1211x1248-1803; priory 1836-1918	extant	Virgin Mary
Abbey of Sankt Johanniszelle unter Wildberg; Kloster Sankt Johanniszelle unter Wildberg	Bad Königshofen	Cistercian nuns - before 1207-1555	dissolved	Virgin Mary and Saint John the Evangelist
Pielenhofen Abbey; Kloster Pielenhofen	Pielenhofen	Cistercian nuns 1240-1803; Carmelite nuns 1806-1838; Visitandines (Salesian Sisters) 1838=2010	dissolved	Assumption of the Virgin Mary; priory from 1655 to 1803
Raitenhaslach Abbey; Kloster Raitenhaslach	Raitenhaslach in Burghausen	Cistercian monks 1143-1803	dissolved	Saint Pancras
Schlüsselau Abbey; Kloster Schlüsselau	Schlüsselau in Frensdorf	Cistercian nuns c.1280-1553	dissolved	Virgin Mary and the Suffering Trinity
Schönau Abbey; Kloster Schönau	Gemünden am Main	Cistercian nuns 1189-1564; Minorites 1699-	extant	Immaculate Conception
Seligenporten Abbey; Kloster Seligenporten	Pyrbaum	Beguines 1239-1242; Cistercian nuns 1242-1576, 1625-1671; Visitation Sisters 1671-1803; Cistercian monks 1930/31-1967	dissolved	Virgin Mary
Seligenthal Abbey; Kloster Seligenthal	Landshut	Cistercian nuns 1232-1803	dissolved	Virgin Mary
Sonnefeld Abbey; Kloster Sonnefeld	Sonnefeld	Cistercian nuns 1260-1572	dissolved	Virgin Mary
Thyrnau Abbey; Kloster Thyrnau	Thyrnau	Cistercian nuns from 1902	extant	Virgin Mary and Saint Joseph
Basilica of the Fourteen Holy Helpers; Kloster Vierzehnheiligen	Bad Staffelstein	Cistercian monks from Langheim Abbey 15th century / 1744-1803; Franciscan friars from 1839	extant	friary attached to the basilica; a community of the Franziskusschwestern has also been established here since 1913
Walderbach Abbey; Kloster Walderbach (also Waldersbach or Walderbaum)	Walderbach	Augustinian Canons c.1140-1143; Cistercian monks 1143-1803	dissolved	Virgin Mary and Saint Nicholas
Waldsassen Abbey, also Waldsassen Priory; Kloster Waldsassen	Waldsassen	Cistercian monks c.1128-1803; Cistercian nuns 1864-	extant	Reichsabtei 1147-1543; priory from 1864 to 1925
Wechterswinkel Abbey; Kloster Wechterswinkel	Wechterswinkel in Bastheim	Cistercian nuns 1134/35-1592	dissolved	Holy Trinity and Saint Margaret

== See also ==
- List of Christian monasteries in Germany

== Sources ==
- Sterba, Thomas, 2010: Herders Neues Klösterlexikon. Herder-Verlag. ISBN 9783451305009
- Haus der Bayerischen Geschichte: Klöster in Bayern
- Orden.de: information on extant religious houses in Germany
