= Bavarian Congregation =

The Bavarian Congregation is a congregation of the Benedictine Confederation consisting (with one exception) of monasteries in Bavaria, Germany.

It was founded on 26 August 1684 by Pope Innocent XI (1676-1689).

== First Congregation ==
Until the secularisation of Bavaria in 1803 the following abbeys belonged to the congregation:

- Andechs Abbey
- Attel Abbey
- Benediktbeuern Abbey
- Ensdorf Abbey
- Frauenzell Abbey
- Mallersdorf Abbey
- Michelfeld Abbey
- Oberaltaich Abbey
- Prüfening Abbey
- St. Emmeram's Abbey
- Reichenbach Abbey
- Rott Abbey
- Scheyern Abbey
- Tegernsee Abbey
- Thierhaupten Abbey
- Weihenstephan Abbey
- Weissenohe Abbey
- Weltenburg Abbey
- Wessobrunn Abbey

All these monasteries were dissolved in 1803, however, and the congregation lapsed at that point.

== Second Congregation ==
The congregation was re-established by Pope Pius IX on 5 February 1858, comprising to begin with three monasteries re-founded by Ludwig I of Bavaria: Metten; St. Boniface's Abbey, Munich, with Andechs Priory; and Weltenburg.

As of 2013 the members of the congregation, with the dates when they joined the congregation where known, were:

- Andechs Priory, dependent on St. Boniface's Abbey, Munich (1858)
- St. Stephen's Abbey, Augsburg
- Braunau in Rohr Abbey (1984)
- Ettal Abbey (1900), with a dependent student house in Munich
- Metten Abbey (1858)
- St. Boniface's Abbey, Munich (1858)
- Niederaltaich Abbey (1918)
- Ottobeuren Abbey (1893)
- Plankstetten Abbey (1904)
- Scheyern Abbey
- Schäftlarn Abbey (1866)
- Wechselburg Priory (in Saxony, a dependent house of Ettal) (1993)
- Weltenburg Abbey (1858)
