= Reichenbach, Upper Palatinate =

Reichenbach
- Municipality
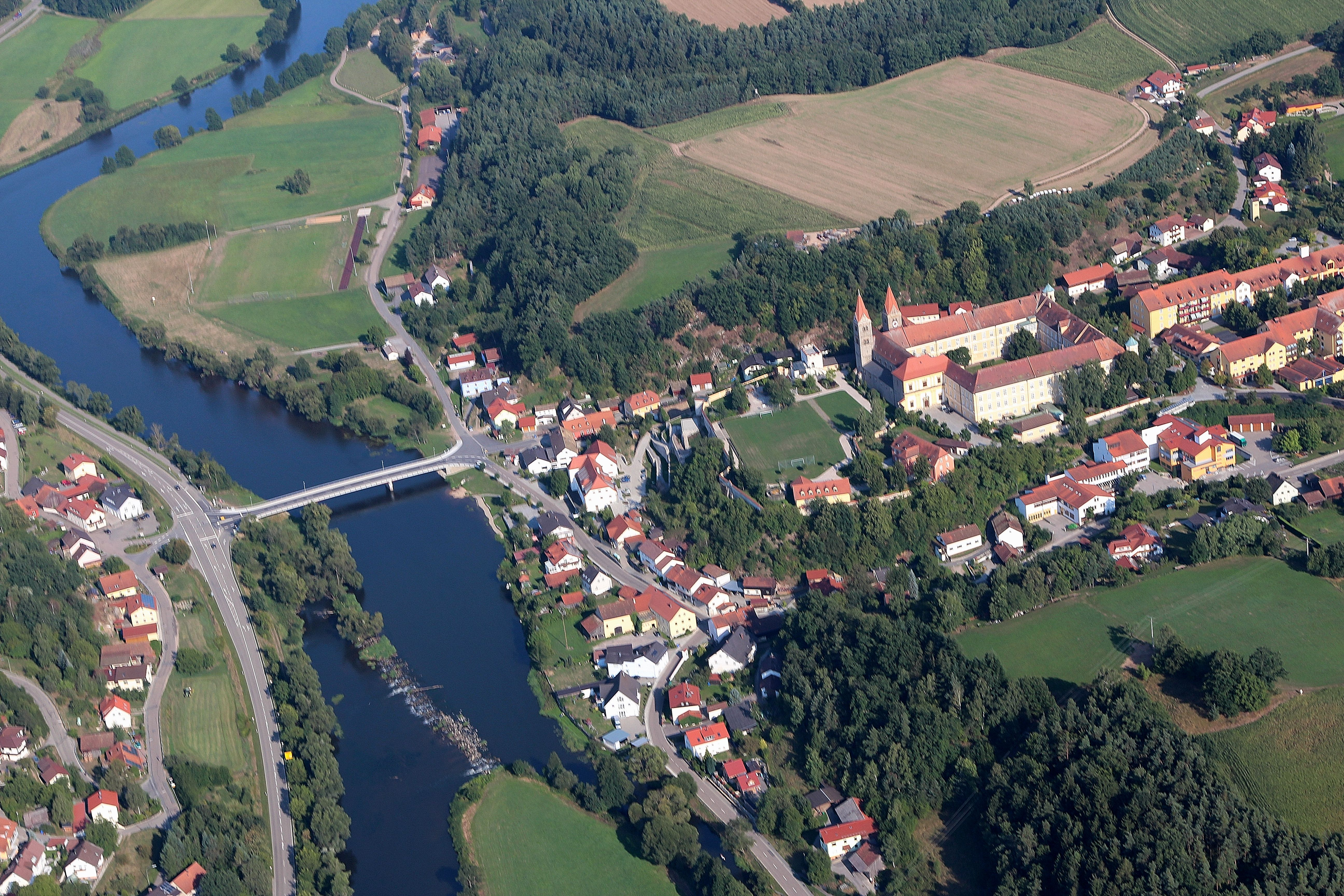
- Aerial view

- Coat of arms

- Location of Reichenbach within Cham district
- Interactive map of Reichenbach
- Location within Germany Location within Bavaria
- Coordinates: 49°11′N 12°21′E
- Country: Germany
- State: Bavaria
- Admin. region: Oberpfalz
- District: Cham
- Municipal assoc.: Walderbach

Government
  - Mayor (2020–26): Eduard Hochmuth

Area
  - Total: 10.53 km^{2} (4.07 sq mi)
- Elevation: 386 m (1,266 ft)

Population (2025-12-31)
  - Total: 1,288
  - Density: 122.3/km^{2} (316.8/sq mi)
- Time zone: UTC+01:00 (CET)
  - Summer (DST): UTC+02:00 (CEST)
- Postal codes: 93189
- Dialling codes: 0 94 64
- Vehicle registration: CHA
- Website: www.gemeinde-reichenbach.de

Reichenbach (German pronunciation: [ˈʁaɪçn̩bax]), also known as Reichenbach am Regen, is a municipality in the district of Cham in Bavaria, Germany. It lies on the river Regen, approximately 20 kilometres northeast of Regensburg. The town is home to Reichenbach Abbey, a former mediaeval Benedictine monastery and Baroque church. Currently living within the renovated monastery are more than 400 people with physical and mental disabilities and about 500 staff. This makes it the most important employer in the region.

== Geography ==
Reichenbach lies in the Falkensteiner Vorwald, in the middle Regental, on the river Regen. To the north and west it borders with Walderbach, to the south with Wald and to the west with Nittenau (District Schwandorf)

=== Subdivisions ===
The municipality of Reichenbach is subdivided in seven localities:

- Heimhof
- Hochgart
- Kaltenbach
- Kienleiten
- Linden
- Reichenbach
- Windhof

As of November 1, 2013, a part of the dissolved municipality-free area of Einsiedler and Walderbacher Forst was incorporated into Reichenbach.

== History ==
=== Early history and Middle Ages ===
The first human presence in the area of Reichenbach may date back to the Paleolithic Age. This is proved by the findings of hunting weapons and sacrificial altars in the surrounding districts.

The settlement in the valley of the river Regen lies on a ford and was the center of a manorial district in the early Middle Ages. 1118 saw the founding of Reichenbach Abbey and from then on the history of the settlement became heavily intertwined with that of the monastery.

Reichenbach experienced an early bloom in the first decades of its existence. After the Wittelsbach dynasty took over the Vogtei (bailiwick) in 1204, Reichenbach lost its regional importance. At the beginning of the 15th century, the monastery was largely rebuilt in Gothic style and surrounded by fortifications. These averted the Hussite invasions in 1428 and 1433.

Under the principle of cuius regio, eius religio after 1555 it was up to the ruler to determine the religion of his subjects. Otto Henry, Elector Palatinate from 1556 to 1559, made official the Lutheran confession and dissolved the monastery in 1556. In Reichenbach, it was up to Johannes Hagnus, a graduate of the University of Wittenberg, to enforce the regulation. During the subsequent reign of Elector Friedrich III (1559–1576), who was a follower of the reformed Calvinist school, Hagnus was dismissed together with many other Lutheran clergymen. Around 1570 many works of art inside Reichenbach Abbey were destroyed by Calvinist iconoclasts.

From 1626, the new Electorate of Bavaria re-catholicized Reichenbach. Under the new Electoral administration in 1661, Benedictines moved back into the monastery which from 1669 fell under the management of Saint Emmeram's Abbey in Regensburg. In 1695, the monastery again became an independent abbey and experienced a second flourishing.

=== 18th and 19th centuries ===
With the dissolution and secularization of the monastery in 1803, the lively scientific and literary activity of the Reichenbach Benedictines came to an end. Since then, the church has been a filial church of the parish of Walderbach. The monastery initially became state property, before the buildings were auctioned off in 1820. The monastery buildings found various uses, including an earthenware factory founded in 1841 by Heinrich Waffler, which he operated until 1863.

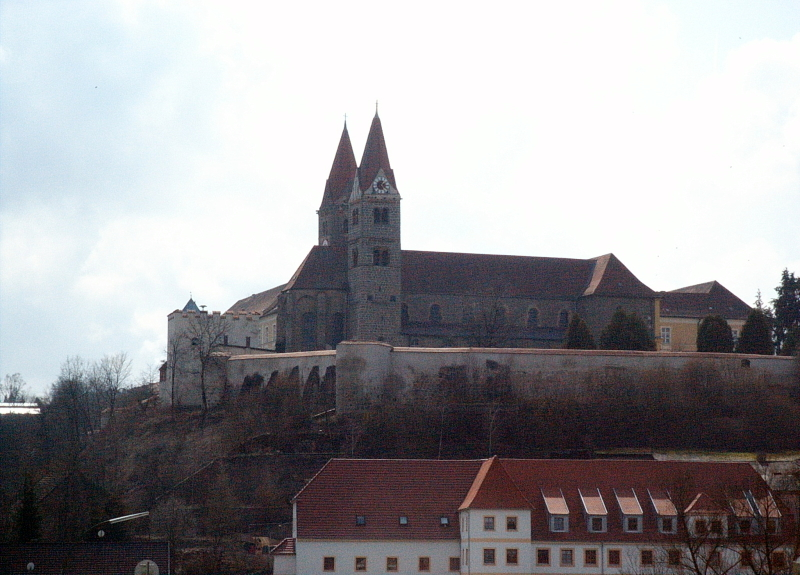
View of the former Reichenbach Abbey

On February 20, 1882, the Reichenbach Volunteer Fire Department was founded due to several fires in the village. The citizens joined to form a community and purchased firefighting equipment. 56 citizens were among the founding members. Statutes were drawn up, the first purpose of which was to provide service in case of fire danger for the protection of persons and their property, first in the village of Reichenbach, then also in the surrounding area. The first Captain was Alois Pestenhofer.

In 1890 the order of the Barmherzige Brüder (Brothers of Mercy) took over the monastery buildings and established a sanatorium and nursing home for the mentally and physically handicapped.

In 1893, the monastery began to operate its own brewery. At the beginning of Holy Week in the same year, the planned construction of the new and larger water pipeline was started. The springs were located at the Windhof.

In 1897, during the night of September 23–24, a fire broke out in the monastery buildings. The fire spread at breakneck speed, and 140 patients had to be evacuated. Of great help was the new water pipe, as the adjacent pond was already pumped dry after a short time. The fire raged for eight days, and even after six weeks, glowing debris was still being pulled out of the rubble. The fire did not claim any human lives, but the monastery was left nothing more than a smoking ruin. The people of Reichenbach lent a huge hand in the reconstruction. Around Christmas 1897, the patients who had been transferred to Straubing and Attl could be brought back. As a result of the fire, a permanent night watchman was employed in Reichenbach in 1898.

At the turn of the 19th century, the village was in bitter poverty. The population was mostly rural, and there was not enough food for the cattle. Many residents had no proper homes, adequate clothing, or a steady income. Many cycled great distances to neighbouring towns like Wackersdorf and Maxhütte to earn scant wages. Others saw emigrating to America as their only hope of survival.

=== Beginning of the 20th century ===
In 1900, the tavern in the monastery was closed. For the washhouse and garden, a new water pipe was installed, since the one built in 1893 did not supply enough water in dry weather. In 1908, under Father Eberhard Forstner from Kaisheim, the Reichenbach mortuary was built. He had a hopfield planted near the monastery, the yield of which was quite sufficient to meet the needs of the monastery's brewery. In addition, a granite quarry was discovered between Windhof and the nearby forest, where a field forge was built at the same time.

The biggest and best work of the prior was the construction of the road between Kienleiten and Roßbach (today's Kreisstraße CHA 25). The road conditions in Reichenbach were at the time very bad. The only road to the monastery led through the village (Pfisterstraße) and there were massive difficulties with the neighbors during the construction. In 1911, under Prior Father Sympert Fleischmann, the infrastructure in the village was improved. His main focus was to push the continuation of the road to Roßbach. Half of the village was canalized and a wide road crossed through Reichenbach. A new water pipeline was built for about 20 houses in Reichenbach. This water pipeline was in operation until the introduction of the district-wide water supply in 1967. Users were allowed to use the water only after it had been boiled because bacteria were repeatedly found in it.

=== First World War and the inter-war period ===
The First World War (1914–1918) claimed its victims in Reichenbach as well. The men of the village and also 23 brothers were drafted into military service, with 25 not surviving the war and 5 going missing. During the war, food had already become very scarce, therefore ration stamps were issued in town. This situation continued for a long time after the war. In addition, came extreme inflation, which rendered money worthless.

Starting in 1919, an electrically operated grinding mill was put into operation, which was discontinued in 1943 by order of the authorities. On May 1, 1920, electricity generated from steam was brought to the monastery.

In 1921, in view of the general housing shortage in the community of Reichenbach, all immigration from outside the community was prohibited as of March 1. In 1922 the water turbine on the nearby Regen River was improved. Then in 1923 electric light was introduced in the whole community. The currency reform in 1923 brought a great improvement.

In 1924, a devastating fire struck the monastery during the night of March 2 to 3. The woodyard and the barn burned down completely. All supplies of fodder and straw were lost, together with many wagons and plows. As soon as March 5, the monastery bell announced another fire. This time a barn in Kienleiten was on fire. Thanks to prompt intervention, the nearby residential house could be saved. On March 7, two days later, there was a third fire alarm. This time the house next to it burned down.

Also in 1924, the monastery's own sawmill was built. During the completion phase of the hydroelectric power plant on the Regen River, two floods occurred. The rain rolled in enormous masses of water and the building threatened to collapse. These events delayed the construction, which was finally completed in 1926. It now had a capacity of 20 horsepower.

In 1927, the municipal council decided to levy a beer tax, 1 Reichsmark per hectoliter, as of July 1. Effective as from December 11, 1927, at the request of the monastery, the tax on beer was reduced to 50 pfennig.

From 1933, Reichenbach and the monastery were not spared by the terror of the Nazi regime. Disabled people housed in the monastery, considered "unworthy of life" at that time, suffered inhumane atrocities.

=== Second World War ===
Out of the men drafted from the town, 31 were killed in action and 6 were missing. In contrast to the First World War, the civilian population was also directly affected by the acts of war in the Second World War and often had to leave their homes and seek shelter in the cellars of the monastery.

When Nittenau was bombed, Reichenbach citizens were also among those seriously injured and killed. Because of the air raids, all windows had to be darkened from the inside. This was mandatory and its enactment was strictly controlled. Forced labourers from occupied areas of the German Reich, mainly France and Poland, were also used in Reichenbach, mostly in agricultural operations. In 1942, bell tolls had to be paid again, and only the smallest bell remained in the clock tower.

=== End of the war and postwar period ===
Towards the end of the war, the monastery became home to a military training camp where the Hitler Youth was to be trained for service at the front. The commander of the camp wanted to resist the approaching American troops and had tank barriers erected. The American response was clear: if even one shot was fired, Reichenbach would be bombed. Thereupon the population fled to Hochgart. The commander also fled but was captured and shot by the Americans in Falkenstein a short time later.

When the Allies approached, the Flossenbürg concentration camp was evacuated. On the death march that followed, the prisoners passed also through Reichenbach. Since it was night, some of them took the chance and dared to escape to the Häring brewery. Some of them were shot immediately; a few others hid in barns. On April 24, 1945, American troops occupied the monastery. For the villagers and especially the children, who had never seen a person with a different skin color, the black soldiers were a surprise. The occupation of Reichenbach by the Americans passed without major incidents.

After the war, Reichenbach had to accommodate German refugees. Just as in World War I, food was issued only on ration stamps, both during the war and afterwards. The villagers were partly able to provide for themselves since almost all of them had at least a small farm.

In 1946 the re-erection of the host cross took place and on June 9 the wooden cross was consecrated at the end of the eight-day mission of the Reichenbach branch.

In 1948 a currency reform took place. The village was hit by a flood in 1954. The bridge over the egen (Regenbrücke) remained impassable for one day. On April 22, 1959, another major fire broke out in an attic of the east wing of the monastery. The large-scale alarm called about 20 fire departments from the surrounding area to the scene, including the professional fire department from Regensburg. The then District Administrator Franz Sackmann immediately mobilized the authorities and initiated all safety measures to protect the endangered artworks. Even a pioneer unit of the Bundeswehr from Bogen was sent. The damage caused by the fire was considerable. It amounted to 172.700,- DM (approximately €88,000) (for comparison, the weekly earnings of a well-paid monastery employee at that time amounted to 35.00 DM/about €18).

=== Contemporary history ===
==== Reichenbacher bridge ====
A crossing over the Regen probably existed before the founding of the Reichenbach monastery in 1118, as there was a road leading from Cham over Reichenbach and Roßbach to Regensburg, Falkenstein and Straubing. The Reichenbacher bridge was mentioned for the first time in 1743 or 1744, when a flood damaged the bridge. In 1750, the wooden bridge was ripped away by an ice jam, after which residents of the village and monastery had to use boats to cross the Regen. In 1803, in the course of secularization, the Bavarian state handed over development of the bridge to the municipality of Reichenbach. In 1831, a flood washed the rebuilt bridge away a second time, after which the creation of a new bridge was vital, because fields, grazing lands, and timber lay on the other side of the Regen and yields were already dangerously low. People who crossed the bridge with horses or used it for agricultural purposes were required to pay a toll. The bridge was always the biggest "problem child" of the community. The citizens always protested against the tolls, and the local council wanted to pass on responsibility for the maintenance of the bridge to the county of Roding. This was finally achieved in 1924, probably in the course of expanding the feeder road (Districtstraße) to the newly built Falkenstein - Regensburg railway line. The expansion of the existing main road - colloquially known as "New Road" - which replaced the current Pfisterstraße as the main street, also dates to this time. The formerly narrow path, which was similar to the nearby Kirchsteig, was greatly widened, despite considerable protest from residents. The battle with the Bavarian State also ended, and it provided funds for a new wooden bridge to be built. After efforts to extinguish a fire at the monastery in 1959 were hindered by the inadequate bearing capacity of the wooden bridge, the creation of another bridge began. Of the total cost of 810,000 DM, only 70,000 DM were paid by the county. The Reichenbach community could only afford to contribute 15,000 DM for the bridge ramp. When the present bridge was completed, it was considered the "most modern prestressed concrete bridge in the Upper Palatinate".

===== Territorial reform =====
The primary school in Reichenbach was dissolved at the beginning of the 1970/71 school year, since the students attend the community school in the Reichenbach Walderbach. By the end of the war, there were the municipalities Reichenbach, and Tiefenbach Treidling. The latter was disbanded in 1945. Reichenbach came to town the hamlet of Linden, Tiefenbach, Heimhof, Windhof, Treidling (name meaning: Treideln,-ing), while Middle Duke, wide-Prince and Gumpinger to the community forest. In 1972 the territory voted to reform the county town allotment to Cham, subject to that community to community forest management and forest Erbach with headquarters in Reichenbach could form. Should the community forest Erbach, the city Roding connect and the community forest remains independently, so the town wanted Reichenbach connection to the city and county Nittenau Schwandorf search. A Roding after incorporation was due to the distance of 15 km rejected. Through this reform area lost the town of Reichenbach 17.7% of its total area. The hamlet of Forestry, hunters height, Treidling and Holzseige (except Kaltenbach), and later even Tiefenbach, came to town Nittenau. Among the missing Gewerbesteuereinhamen, including the quarry in Treidling, the town still suffers today, because there was no compensation. The Reichenbach community remained independent, but formed an administrative branch along with the Walderbach community.

===== Development of the town =====
1975 finally made the construction of the drainage system (sewage). In 1976 the Johann-of-God-workshops were created. This is a workshop for Pfleglinge of the monastery, as well as external Pfleglinge.

In 1984 the era of "brewery Härig Reichenbach" came to an end. The brewery was founded in 1756. The last owners Anna and George Häring died in 1978.

In 1991, the kindergarten of St. Paul on the operation. Mid-July 1993 celebrated the town and the monastery "Kloster Reichenbach 875 years." Over the years, further construction expelled. 1998, the inauguration of the family chapel Reisinger Kienleiten in honor of St. Catherine instead.

In 1999, in the context of urban development of "Margrave-Dipold Square" (church) and the Eustachius-Kugler-road rehabilitated. On January 1, 2000, the new millennium was celebrated punctually at 12:00 o'clock with a huge fireworks display in the former convent garden. In 2001, the county road CHA 25 (main street) in Reichenbach up area was completely renovated and a sidewalk was built.

===== 2002 flood =====
In August 2002, Reichenbach and all other areas in the path of rainwater flow were ravaged in an unprecedented flood. On the evening of August 12, a fire started in the youth campground spaces. On the night of 13 August, a disaster alert was announced for the county. It was already clear at that time that the flood would exceed all expectations. The highest level of alarm was sounded at about 10 o'clock. From 6 o'clock until 2 the next morning, the level was no longer measured due to the enormous amount of water. In some streets the water was close to two meters above the road surface

A year later, the waterfront promenade was completely redesigned.

== Population development ==
Year:	1960	1970	1980	1990	1995	2000	2005	2010	2015	2019	2020	2021	2022
Population:	1131	1101	1104	1119	1176	1152	1199	1242	1301	1328	1334	1317	1340

== Politics ==
=== Municipal council ===
The council consists of 12 members, including a woman.

CSU 6 seats FWR (Free Community voters Reichenbach) 6 seats

==== Mayor ====
The Mayor of Reichenbach is Eduard Hochmuth, elected in March 2020.

==== Coat of arms ====
The coat of arms shows a red dragon rising above a blue Wellenschildfuß against a white background.

The place Reichenbach, always in close relationship with the in the 12th century Benedictine monastery was founded, had since your 15th century, the status of a market whose own administration led seals. A still preserved in the early 17th century copied temple shows a seal coat of arms, the founder of the monastery Reichenbach attributed heraldic figure, depicting the dragon. The image of this traditional emblem recalled the close relationship between city and monastery Reichenbach. To document the situation of the community on rain water was considered a symbol of so-called Wellenschildfuß elected, making a historic and equally motivated heraldic emblem community has been obtained.

== Arts and Culture ==
=== Religion ===
Reichenbach belongs to the parish forest Walderbach, at 1 September 2005 "Spiritual Unity Walderbach-Neubäu" has been extended. In the village are the Church of the Assumption Convent and other bands, such as The Queen of the Rosary Chapel House in the monastery of the Brothers of Mercy, which Painful Lady Chapel Hill (built in 1935 on the occasion of the 800th anniversary of the consecration of the monastery church), the Lady Chapel at Field Linden (built in 1950) and Katherine's Chapel in Kienleiten (Erected Fam by the Reisinger in 1998).

=== Church and customs ===
Numerous are the testimonies of former folk piety, in woods and fields to find. At some of them are still prayers and Masses celebrated, for example at the Marienplatz or at the so-called "Pfaffenstein."

On 9 June 1949 was the so-called "cross-host" on a hill above the town doomed, which residents of Reichenbach, thanks to build, that the village in war threats spared. It bears the inscription "In this sign you will sing - for special thanks for protecting our village in danger of war" and was already established in 1946. Following the tradition there has been a cross 1914/1918 have confessed that during the period from 1939 to 1945 by fanatical groups was destroyed.

Since 1998, a prayer site has been accessible via the Sonnhofweg, a road near a crossroads. The Stations of the Cross were artistically designed by local residents and employees of the monastery of the Brothers of Mercy.

Marian devotion played in Reichenbach traditionally an important role. Persuade them, among other things Lourdesgrotte in the apse of the monastery church, which was inaugurated in 1895, and the mountain chapel in the street Pfister. The latter was built in 1935. The rock beside the chapel served the villagers during the Second World War as a protective bunker.

Since 1998, invites a chapel in Kienleiten the faithful to prayer. It was from the family Gerhard Reisinger after a promise is built and the St. Catherine doomed.

Not imagine from the church life were the Bittgänge, of community in which to weather and a good harvest was asked. On these occasions believers came from forest Erbach and Reichenbach to pray together. Reichenbach once attracted the forest after Erbach, another look at the forest after Erbacher Reichenbach, with them the faithful from praying Reichenbach went forward.

A highlight of the church year was certainly the Corpus Christi festival, in the vernacular "Prangertag referred. The path along which the procession went, it was with so-called "pillory Perennials" (birch), reed grass and fresh pine green with scarves and flags decorated. In addition, figurines and pictures of saints up to the house walls attached. Two statues of Our Lady, also per a figure of Joseph and Jesus were decorated with flowers and girls in the procession supported. For "Prangertag" belonged to it that the "landlord" or "Haering" to the traditional sausage meal went. Even if the sausages on the menu today are nothing more extraordinary, this usage has to this day.

=== Music ===
Reichenbach Church (since 1993) Reichenbacher monastery sparrows Employees choir of the monastery Reichenbach

=== Buildings ===
Monastery of the Brothers of Mercy 1118 Founded former Benedictine abbey Romanesque monastery church (interior in the style of the Baroque and Rococo redesigned) Lourdesgrotte in the apse of the monastery church

=== Monuments ===
Marienplatz (Marie picture and a wooden cross in the forest, space for prayer and worship) Pfaffenstein (highest point in the up area, located in the forest, a wooden cross in the rock, space for prayer and worship) Teufelsbuchs'n (Teufelsbuz'n) (steep cliffs with a short Schliefröhre in Kienleiten; under BUZ is a creature of stunted growth)

=== Sport ===
Recreation center of the DJK Reichenbach

=== Events ===
Easter market in the monastery Reichenbach Maifeier on youth campground Johannifeier on youth campground Dorfkirta in the beer garden (Patron's Feast) Christkindlmarkt (Christmas market) in the monastery Reichenbach

== Economy and infrastructure ==
The Monastery of the Merciful Reichenbach brothers live more than 400 people with physical and mental disability and are about 500 employees. This makes it the most important employers in the region. Furthermore, in Reichenbach with a supermarket butcher, several master carpentry businesses, a master car, a vehicle body and paint shops, a plant for interior and Akustikbau, an advertising technology agency and other small businesses located. There are numerous small and large farms in Reichenbach.

=== Transportation ===
The municipality parts Reichenbach and Kienleiten are reinforced by a bridge connected. Die Gemeinde Reichenbach liegt relativ nahe zu überörtlichen Verkehrsstraßen. Durch den Ort selbst verläuft die Kreisstraße CHA 25 (Hauptstraße) und die CHA 27 (Bodensteiner Straße). Die Ortsteile Reichenbach und Kienleiten sind durch die Staatsstraße St. 2149 getrennt. Der Verkehr in diesem Kreuzungsbereich wird durch eine Ampel geregelt. Die Auffahrt zur neu gebauten B 16 (Roding-Regensburg) ist nur 3,5 km entfernt. Die Zufahrt zur B 85 (Schwandorf-Cham) ist ca. 15 km entfernt.

=== Media ===
- Chamer Zeitung (circulation: 10,215 total) – Regional edition of the Straubinger Tagblattes/Landshuter Zeitung
- Landshuter Bayerwald Echo (circulation: 16,170 total) – Regional edition of the Mittelbayerischen Zeitung
- Regentalanzeiger
- Newsletter of the municipality

=== Education ===
Kindergarten St. Paul Reichenbach eingruppiger is a full-day kindergarten and is due mainly to the needs of working parents aligned. It consists of 1 October 1991. Looked after the children from the third year of life from the municipality and employees of the institution of the Brothers of Mercy Reichenbach. The municipality has no Reichenbach own school (more). Only a professional college education, curative care is available in Reichenbach. This is the monastery of the Brothers of Mercy building. The students from Reichenbach Erbach go to the forest in the primary and secondary school. The nearest school is located in Nittenau (Regentalgymnasium). The nearest school is the State School in Roding.

== Notable people ==
- Andreas von Regensburg (ca. 1380, Reichenbach - after 1442, Regensburg)
- Augustin Wagner (1898, Reichenbach – 1945, Ebrantshausen), a priest in Ebrantshausen (near Mainburg), was named a martyr of Nazism. He preached the encyclical Mit brennender Sorge by Pius XI despite the government ban and was shot in the woods between Holzmannshausen and Meilenhausen at the end of April 1945 on order of an officer of the SS.

All persons listed here were in close contact with the monastery of Reichenbach

- Margrave Diepold III von Vohburg (1075–1146), founder of the monastery.
- Count Palatinate Otto I of Pfalz-Mosbach (1390–1461)
- Johannes Hagius (1530–1596), from 1556 to 1567 preacher and cantor in Reichenbach
- Anselm Meiller OSB, (15 February 1678, Amberg - 18 September 1761, Plankstetten)
- George Dengler (1839–1896)
- Father Andrew Amrhein (4 February 1844, Gunzwil - 29 December 1927, St. Ottilien)
- Eustachius Kugler (15 January 1867, Neuhaus bei Nittenau - 10 June 1946 in Regensburg), was beatified in Regensburg on October 4, 2009.
- Siegfried Hollmer (12 October 1930, Konzell - 19 April 1964), founder of the Burschenverein Reichenbach
