= Mittbach (Isen) =

- Ortsteil of Isen
- Interactive map of Mittbach
- Location within Germany Location within Bavaria
- Coordinates: 48°9′52″N 12°1′47″E
- Country: Germany
- State: Bavaria
- District: Erding
- Municipality: Isen

Area
  - Total: 11.66 km^{2} (4.50 sq mi)
- Elevation: 624 m (2,047 ft)

Population (1961)
  - Total: 684
  - Density: 58.7/km^{2} (152/sq mi)
- Time zone: UTC+01:00 (CET)
  - Summer (DST): UTC+02:00 (CEST)

The village of Mittbach is a south-western part of the market town of Isen in the Upper Bavarian district of Erding, Germany. Until the district reform, which came into force on 1 July 1972, the municipality of Mittbach belonged to the district of Wasserburg am Inn. Since then it has belonged to the district of Erding until its dissolution in 1978.

== History ==
The town was first mentioned as Mitapah in a document from Freising dated 9 December 870. A local nobleman (Otto de Mitepahc) appears around 1150 as a witness with a donation of the noble Wito of Zell to the Ebersberg monastery. Since the foundation of the Freising Burgrain dominion, Mittbach was a southwestern part of it. After its dissolution as a result of secularisation, the community of Mittbach was formed from the south-western quarter of the dominion in 1808 and came to the Wasserburg district office in 1818. In 1939, the municipality of Mittbach in the former administrative district of Wasserburg am Inn was separated from the municipality of Mittbach (south-)west (below) the forest slope of the Mittbacher Au with the lower situated local fields of Au, Berg, Kronacker, Oberkaging and Niederkaging, and was assigned to the municipality of Hohenlinden in the administrative district of Ebersberg.

On 1 May 1978, Mittbach was assigned to Markt Isen as part of the municipal reform.

=== Parish history ===
Until 1450 the church of Mittbach belonged to the parish of Burgrain, then the parish was moved to Mittbach. Until the parish was dissolved in 1828, the branches Burgrain, Kronacker, Hohenlinden, Pyramoos and Wetting belonged to the parish. Then the parish seat was moved to Hohenlinden and Mittbach was integrated into the parish of Pemmering.

== Geography and location description ==
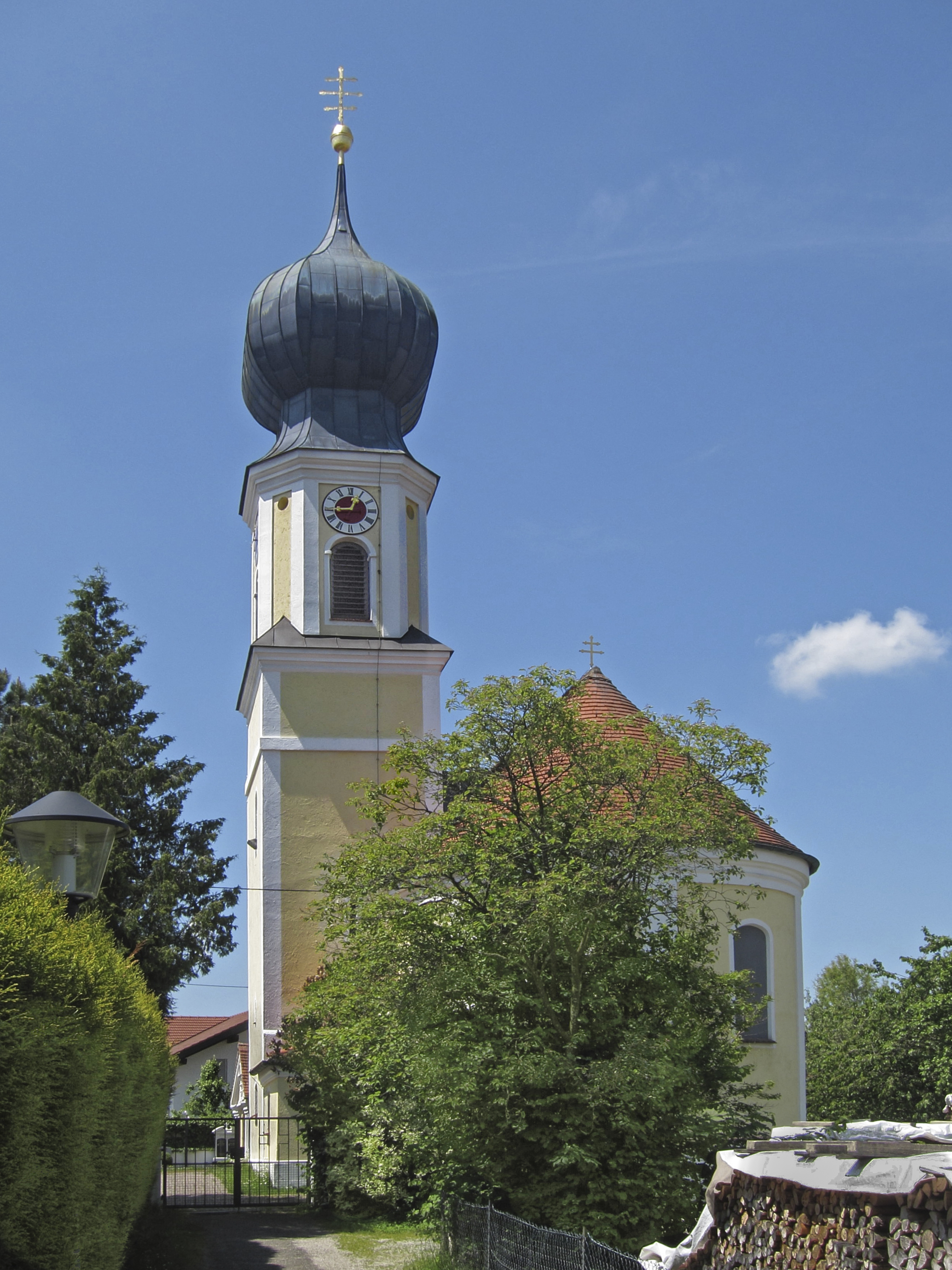
Filial church St. Urban

Mittbach (624 m) lies high above Hohenlinden (540 m) and the upper Isen valley (555 m), on the edge of the Mittbacher Au forest, a foothills of the extensive Großhaag forest. Between Mittbach and the northern neighbouring village of Pemmering there is a free space of only 15 to 20 metres. Today Mittbach is a newer type of a Haufendorf (with a small old village centre), in the centre of which stands the village church. In the course of the first Bavarian survey, the village was chosen as the main triangle point due to its elevated location and surveyed in 1803.

== Filial church St. Urban ==
The original church was a Gothic building, which was probably built between 1475 and 1520, as the tower position reveals. This originally Gothic building (from which remains of the foundation were used) was strongly changed from 1709, in the style of the late Baroque. The interior of the church has a barrel vault with a cap, the frames and crossbands are stuccoed, as well as the ceiling fresco framing in the choir. The late baroque high altar and the left side altar date from around 1710, the right rococo side altar was built in 1765.

== Former municipal area ==
The municipality of 11.66 km^{2} with 684 inhabitants (state of the 1961 census) included the villages of Pemmering, Burgrain and Mittbach, the hamlets of Aich, Fahrnbach, Fleck, Giesering, Hub, Kemating and Reit, as well as the deserted villages of Daxau and Kuglmühle. The districts Au, Berg, Kronacker, Oberkaging and Niederkaging were already assigned to the municipality of Hohenlinden in the district of Ebersberg in 1939. Until then, the municipal area amounted to 14.81 km^{2} (5.72 sq mi).

=== Daxau ===
To the east near Pemmering and Mittbach lies the Daxau, formerly an old farm with its own brewery and tavern until about 1980. From 1958 onwards, the farmer and brewery operator sold land to create a weekend settlement which has grown to 46 residential buildings to date.
