= Joseph of Freising =

Bishop of Freising from 747/748 to 764

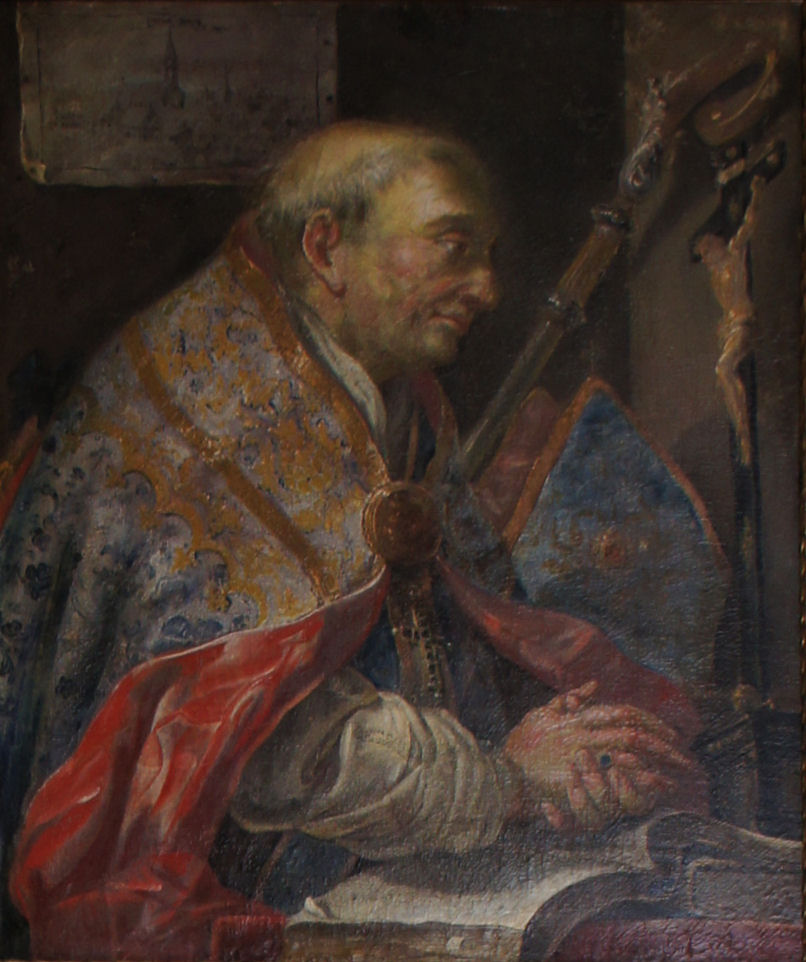
Bishop Joseph of Freising

Joseph of Freising (died 17 January 764), also known as Joseph of Verona, was Bishop of Freising from 747 or 748 until his death.

== Life ==
There is no direct evidence of Joseph's place of origin or place of birth. It is sometimes claimed that he was a native of Verona in Italy, whence his alternative name, but it is equally possible that he was from Bavaria or northern Austria, or perhaps the Tyrol.

He is presumed to have been a monk in Saint Corbinian's new foundation, Freising Abbey, before in 747 or 748 he was appointed bishop of Freising, the third to hold the office. He had the reputation of a zealous and energetic promoter of the interests of the church, to have had a keen grasp of the importance for the church of acquiring large possessions, and to have been highly effective in attracting donations, especially of land.

He was also active as a founder of churches and religious houses. In particular, he founded Isen Abbey in 752, and dedicated it to Saint Zeno of Verona. He was also closely involved, after 760, with the respective lay founders in the establishment of Schäftlarn and Scharnitz Abbeys. At Schäftlarn the founders gave him the power of supervision of the monastery and the right to appoint the abbots: his first appointment was Aribo, Joseph's successor as bishop. At Scharnitz he appointed Atto, Aribo's successor as bishop of Freising, also to be highly successful in the acquisition of estates for the diocese.

== Tomb and cult ==
After his death on 17 January 764, Joseph was buried in the church of Isen Abbey, founded by himself, where his tomb was restored in 1743. The church survived the secularisation of Bavaria in 1802–1803 and is still in service as St. Zeno's, the parish church of Isen.

Joseph is venerated locally as the Blessed Joseph, although he was never formally beatified. His feastday is 17 January.

== Bibliography ==
- Vollständiges Heiligen-Lexikon, Band 3, Augsburg 1869, online at Zeno.org (in German).
- Catholic Encyclopedia: Munich-Freising article.
