= List of Christian monasteries in Germany =

This is a list of Christian religious houses in Germany, both extant and dissolved, and for either men or women (or both), arranged by state.

== Christian monasteries (religious houses) in Germany arranged by state ==
=== Baden-Württemberg ===
- Beuron Archabbey
- See also: Campus Galli - a project to construct a faithful medieval town with a monastery, based on the Plan of Saint Gall; in Meßkirch, Baden-Württemberg

=== Bavaria ===
- see List of Christian monasteries in Bavaria

=== Berlin ===
- see Brandenburg

=== Brandenburg ===
- see List of Christian monasteries in Brandenburg. This list also includes Berlin.

=== Bremen ===
- see Lower Saxony

=== Hamburg ===
- see Schleswig-Holstein

=== Hesse ===
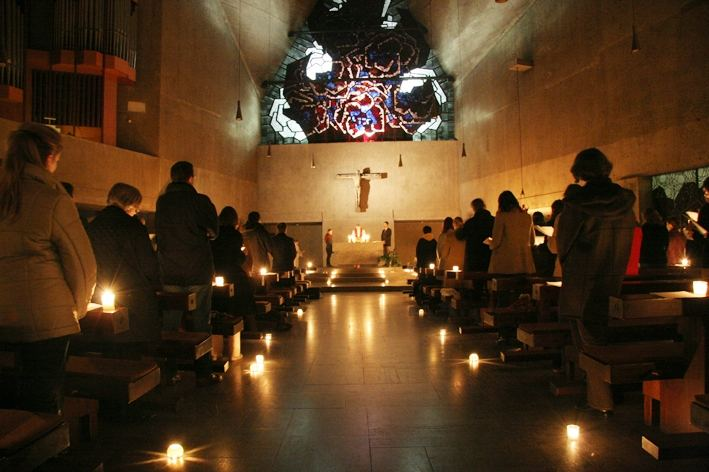
Ignatius church of the Jesuites monastery in Frankfurt am Main

- Eberbach Abbey, Eltville
- Eibingen Abbey, Rüdesheim
- Kloster Gnadenthal, Hünfelden
- see List of Christian monasteries in Hesse

=== Lower Saxony ===
- see List of Christian monasteries in Lower Saxony. This list also includes Bremen.

=== Mecklenburg-Vorpommern ===
- see List of Christian monasteries in Mecklenburg-Vorpommern

=== North Rhine-Westphalia ===
Postcard of the Minorites monastery in Cologne

- see List of Christian monasteries in North Rhine-Westphalia

=== Rhineland-Palatinate ===
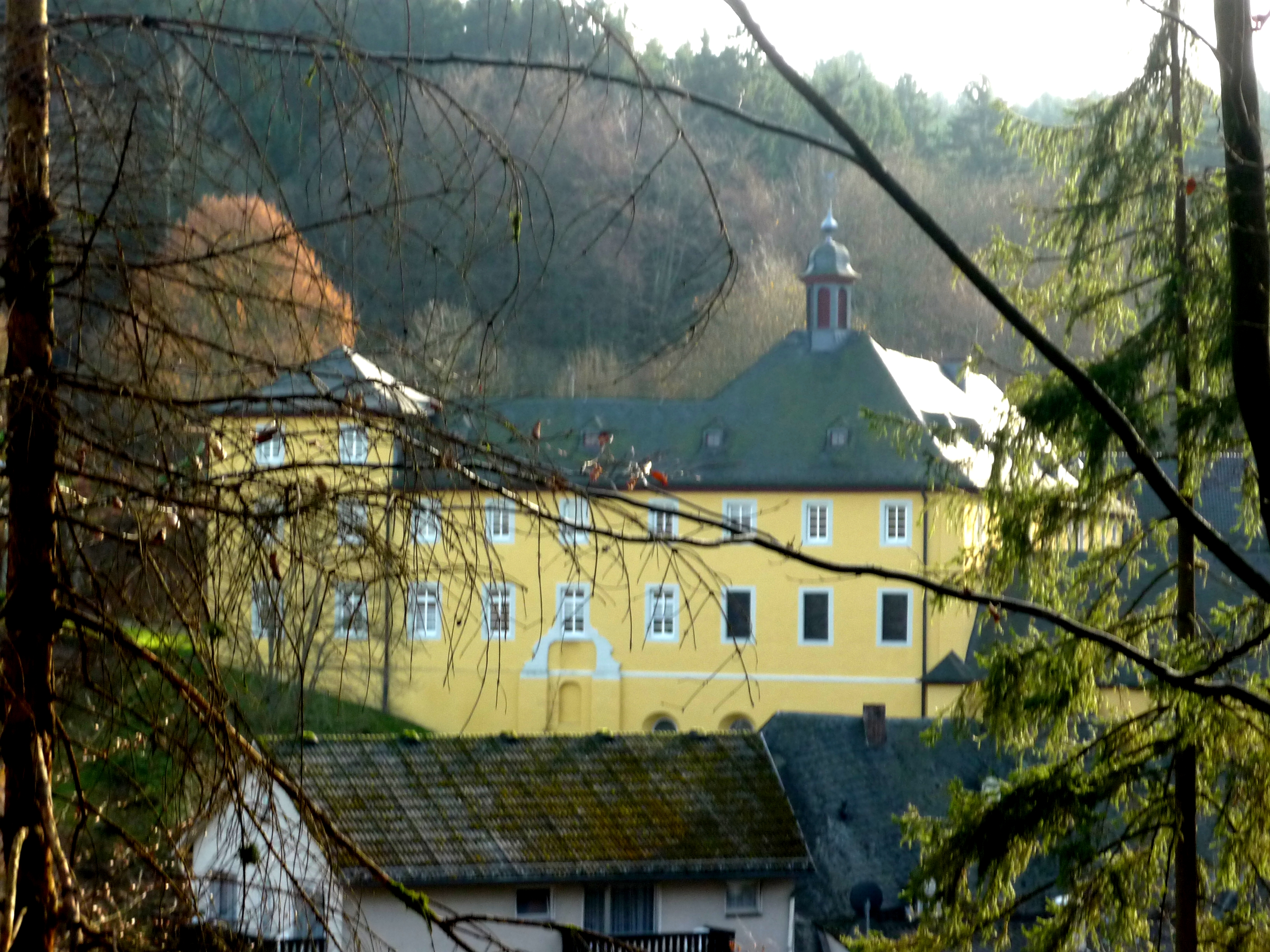
The former Marienthal Friary (Westerwald) near Altenkitchen

- see List of Christian monasteries in Rhineland-Palatinate. This list also includes Saarland.

=== Saarland ===
- see Rhineland-Palatinate

=== Saxony ===
- see List of Christian monasteries in Saxony

=== Saxony-Anhalt ===
- see List of Christian monasteries in Saxony-Anhalt

=== Schleswig-Holstein ===
- see List of Christian monasteries in Schleswig-Holstein. This list also includes Hamburg.

=== Thuringia ===
- see List of Christian monasteries in Thuringia

== See also ==
- List of Carolingian monasteries
- List of Imperial abbeys
- Monasteries in the Archbishopric of Bremen

== Sources ==
- Sterba, Thomas, 2010: Herders Neues Klösterlexikon. Herder-Verlag. ISBN 978-3-451-30500-9
