= Walderbach (Verwaltungsgemeinschaft) =

- Verwaltungsgemeinschaft
- Location of Walderbach within Cham district
- Interactive map of Walderbach
- Location within Germany Location within Bavaria
- Coordinates: 49°11′N 12°23′E
- Country: Germany
- State: Bavaria
- Admin. region: Upper Palatinate
- District: Cham
- Seat: Walderbach
- Subdivisions: 2 municipalities

Area
  - Total: 45.45 km^{2} (17.55 sq mi)

Population (2025-12-31)
  - Total: 3,616
  - Density: 79.56/km^{2} (206.1/sq mi)
- Time zone: UTC+01:00 (CET)
  - Summer (DST): UTC+02:00 (CEST)
- Website: walderbach.de

Walderbach is a Verwaltungsgemeinschaft (municipal association) in the district of Cham in Bavaria, Germany. Its seat is in Walderbach. It consists of the following municipalities:

1. Reichenbach
2. Walderbach
