= Kaisheim Abbey =

Coordinates: 48°46′02″N 10°47′54″E

Imperial Abbey of Kaisersheim Reichsstift Kaisersheim
- 1135–1802 (de jure); 1135–1327 and 1656–1802 (de facto)
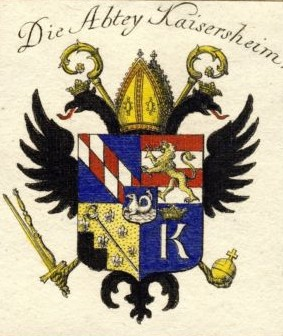
- Coat of arms

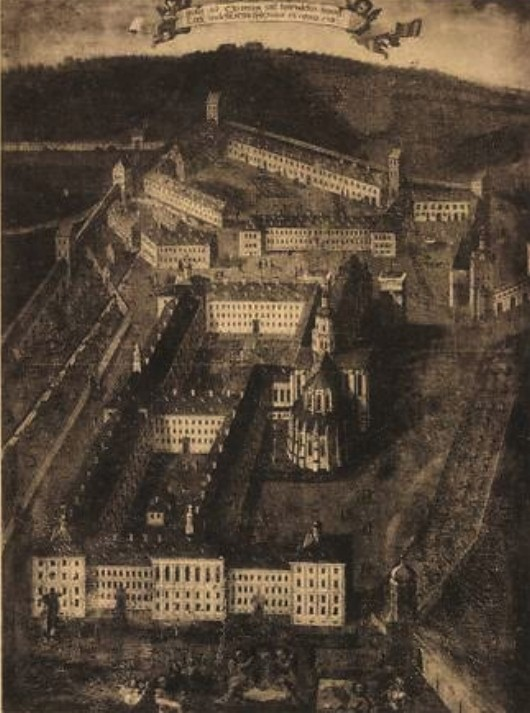
- Kaisersheim in the 18th century
- Status: Imperial Abbey
- Government: Elective principality
- Historical era: Middle Ages
  - Foundation charter: 21 September 1135
  - Dedicated by Bp Augsburg: 1183 1135
  - Cty Lechsgemünd extinct: 1327
  - Immediacy confirmed by Emperor Charles IV: 1346
  - Pfalz-Neuburg inherited the County of Graisbach: 1505
  - Immunity agreed with Philip of Pfalz-Neuburg: 1656
  - Secularised to Bavaria: 1802
Preceded by	Succeeded by
County of Lechsgemünd	Electorate of Bavaria
- Today part of: Germany

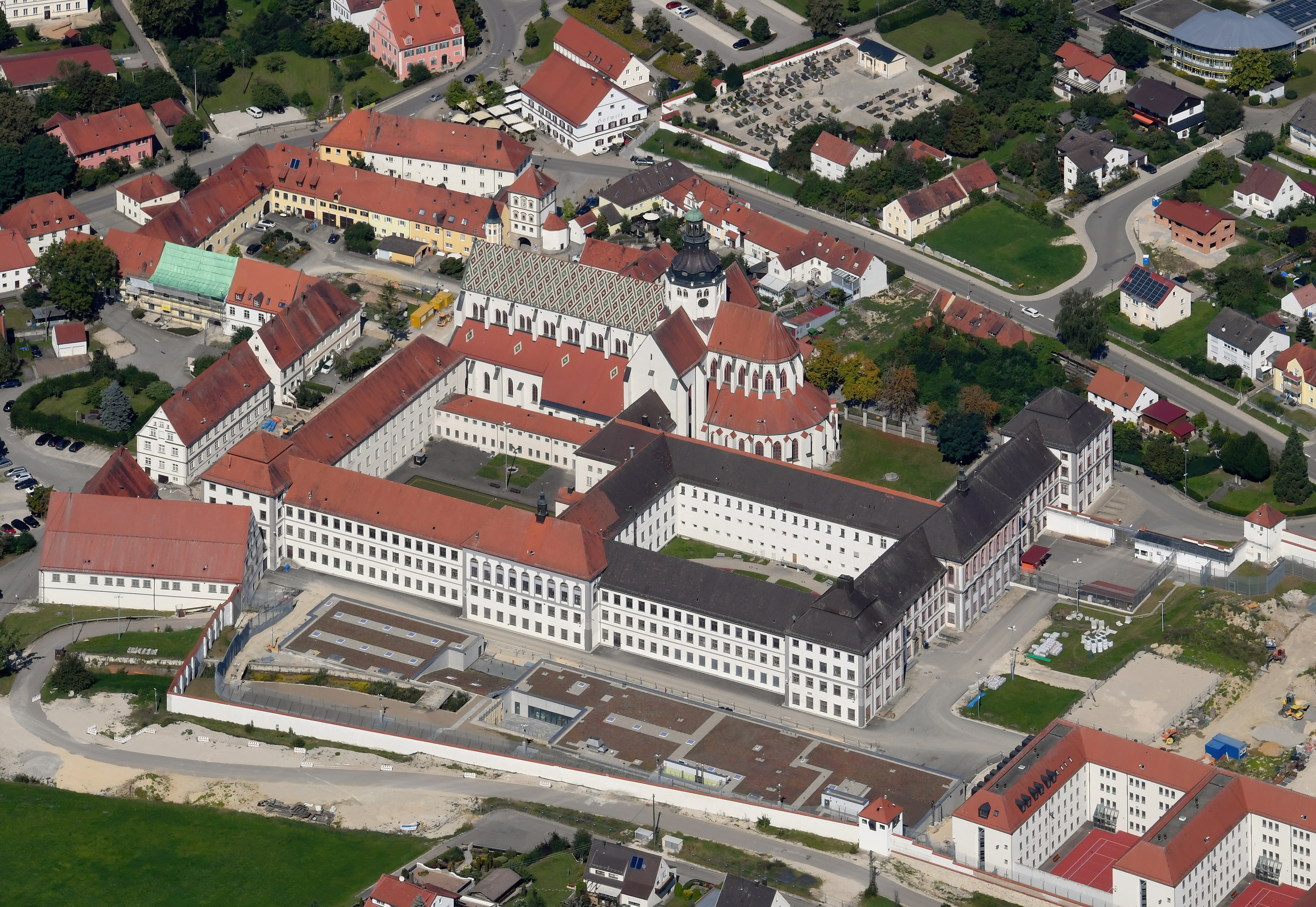
Aerial view of the Kaisheim Abbey

The Imperial Abbey of Kaisersheim (German:Reichsstift Kaisersheim or Kloster Kaisersheim), was a Cistercian monastery in Kaisersheim (now Kaisheim), Bavaria, Germany.

As one of the 40-odd self-ruling imperial abbeys of the Holy Roman Empire, Kaisersheim was a virtually independent state. Its abbot had seat and voice at the Imperial Diet where he sat on the Bench of the Prelates of Swabia. At the time of its secularisation in 1802, the Abbey covered 136 square kilometers and has 9,500-10,000 subjects.

== History ==
The monastery was founded by Henry II, Count of Lechsgemünd (d. 1142) and his wife Liutgard, and was a daughter house of Lucelle Abbey in Alsace. Count Henry's initial gift of the land was made in 1133; the foundation charter was dated 21 September 1135. The first church was dedicated in 1183 by the Bishop of Augsburg, but was damaged in a fire in 1286, and re-built in its entirety between 1352 and 1387, when the new building was dedicated.

The foundation charter guaranteed the new monastery immunity and independence from secular powers, but on the extinction of the Counts of Lechsgemünd in 1327, their territories passed to the Wittelsbach Counts of Graisbach, who were unwilling to honour the original terms. Although in 1346 the abbey succeeded in obtaining from the Emperor Charles IV a confirmation of the rights included in the charter, and was declared an Imperial abbey (German: Reichstift), the Wittelsbachs were not inclined to honour it.

In 1505, the territory of Pfalz-Neuburg was created, which inherited the rights of the County of Graisbach, including territorial rights over Kaisheim. During the Reformation, the conversion of Otto Henry, Duke of Neuburg and Elector Palatine, to Protestantism, led to fears the abbey would be dissolved, although this danger soon passed.

Finally, in 1656 the then abbot George IV Müller reached agreement with Duke Philip of Pfalz-Neuburg that the abbey's Imperial immediacy (German: Reichsfreiheit) would be respected. This carried with it the obligation however to provide troops to the imperial army when required, and from this date onwards the abbey had to accommodate a small standing force of soldiers of some 80 men.

The buildings underwent a major re-building in the 1720s in the Baroque style.

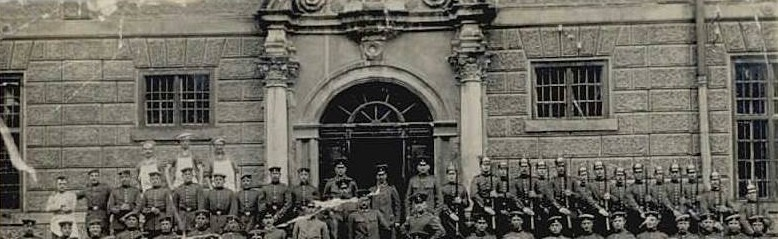
The former abbey as a penitentiary

In 1802, the abbey was dissolved in the secularisation of Bavaria, and its assets taken by the Bavarian state. The premises were at first used for military purposes, later as accommodation for the displaced Bavarian Franciscans. From 1816, the buildings have been used as a prison, and now house the Justizvollzugsanstalt Kaisheim.

The Kaiser's Hall and the library are of particular architectural interest. In the east wing, known as the Kaiser's wing, the Bayerisches Strafvollzugsmuseum (English: Bavarian Museum of Punishment) has displayed the permanent exhibition Behind Bars since 1989.

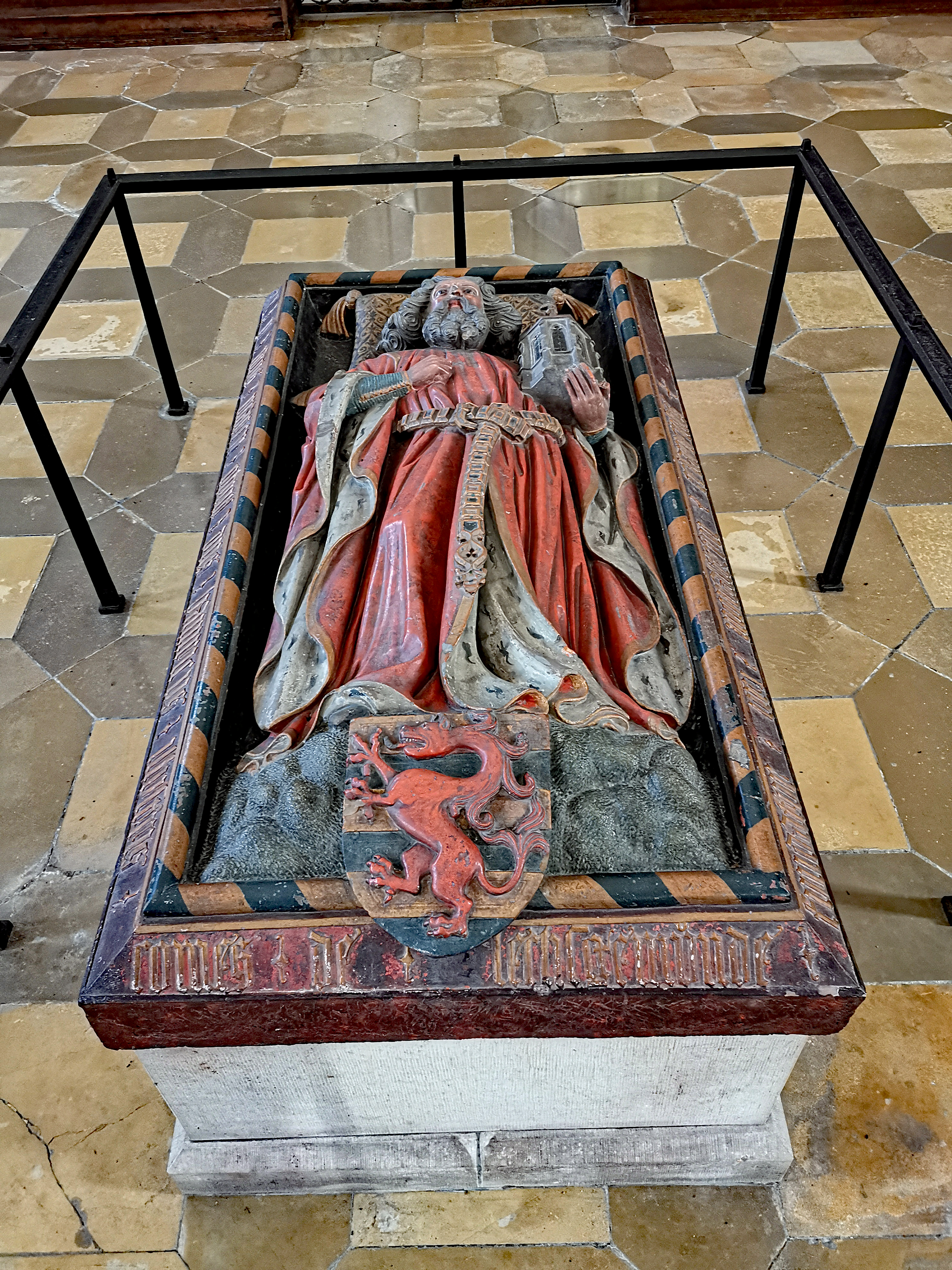
The tomb of Henry III, Count of Lechsgemünd, in Kaisheim Abbey

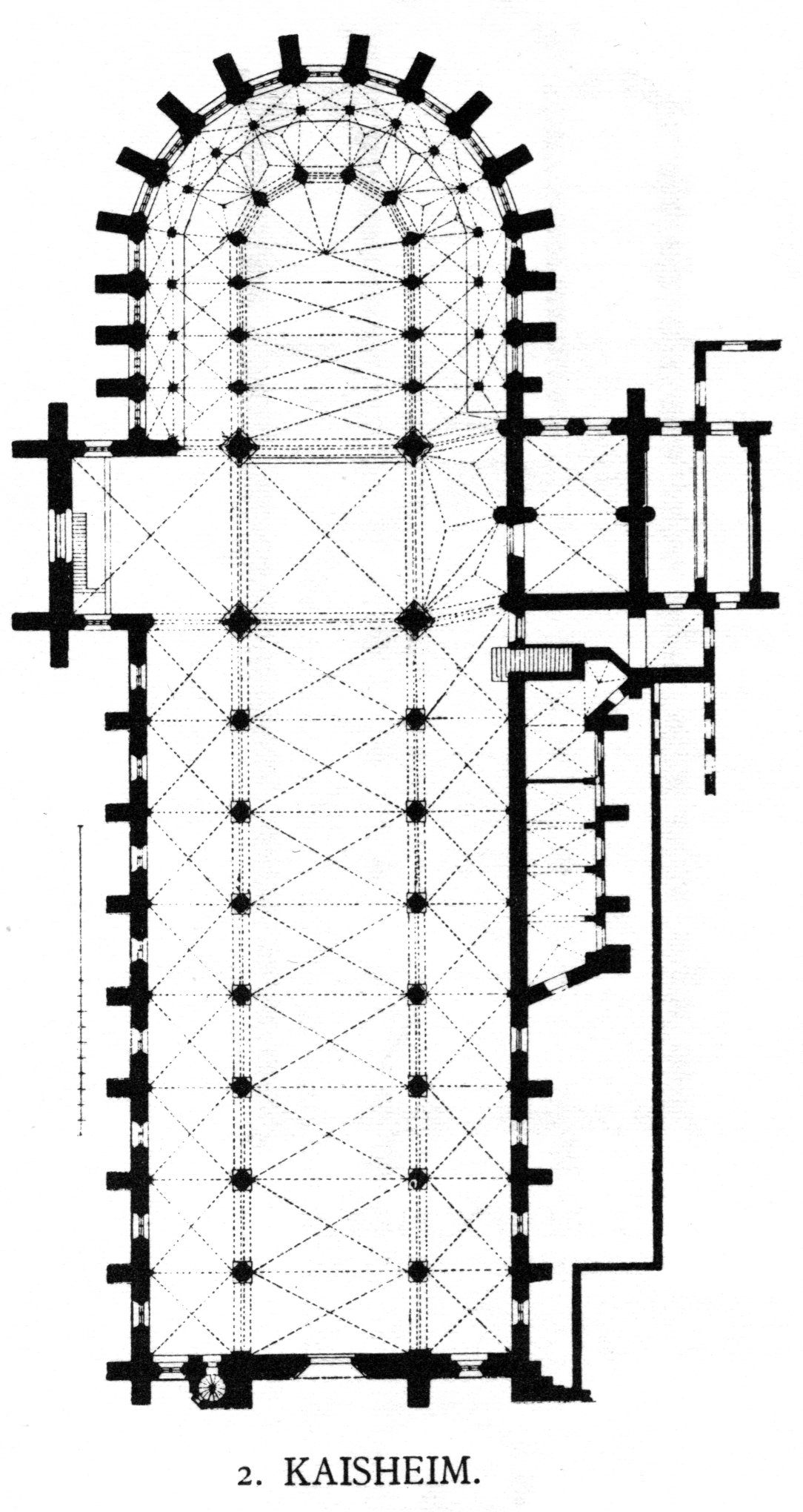
Plan of Kaisheim Abbey church

== Abbots of Kaisersheim ==
- Udalrich 1133-1155
- Konrad I 1155-1165
- Diethelm 1165-1174
- Albert 1174-1194
- Ebbo 1194-1210
- Konrad II 1210-1228
- Heinrich I 1228-1239
- Richard 1239-1251
- Wolvich 1251-1262
- Heinrich II 1262-1266
- Trutwin 1266-1287
- Heinrich III 1287-1302
- Johann I Chonold 1302-1320
- Ulrich I Zoller 1320-1339
- Ulrich II Nubling 1339-1360
- Johann II Zauer 1360-1379
- Johann III Molitor 1379-1400
- Johann IV Scherb 1400-1422
- Kraft von Hochstadt 1422-1427
- Leonhard Weinmayer 1427-1440
- Nikolaus Kolb 1440-1458
- Georg I 1458-1479
- Johann V Vister 1479-1490
- Georg II Kastner 1490-1509
- Konrad III Reutter 1509-1540
- Johann VI Zauer 1540-1575
- Ulrich III 1575-1586
- Georg III 1586-1589
- Domenicus 1589-1594
- Sebastian 1594-1608
- Johann VII 1608-1626
- Jakob 1626-1637
- Georg IV 1637-1667
- Benedikt 1667-1674
- Hieronymus 1675-1681
- Elias 1681-1696
- Judas Thaddäus 1696-1698
- Roger von Röltz 1698-1739
- Cölestin I Meermols 1739-1771
- Cölestin II Angelsbrucker 1771-1783
- Franz Xaver Müller 1783-1803
