= Marxheim =

- Municipality
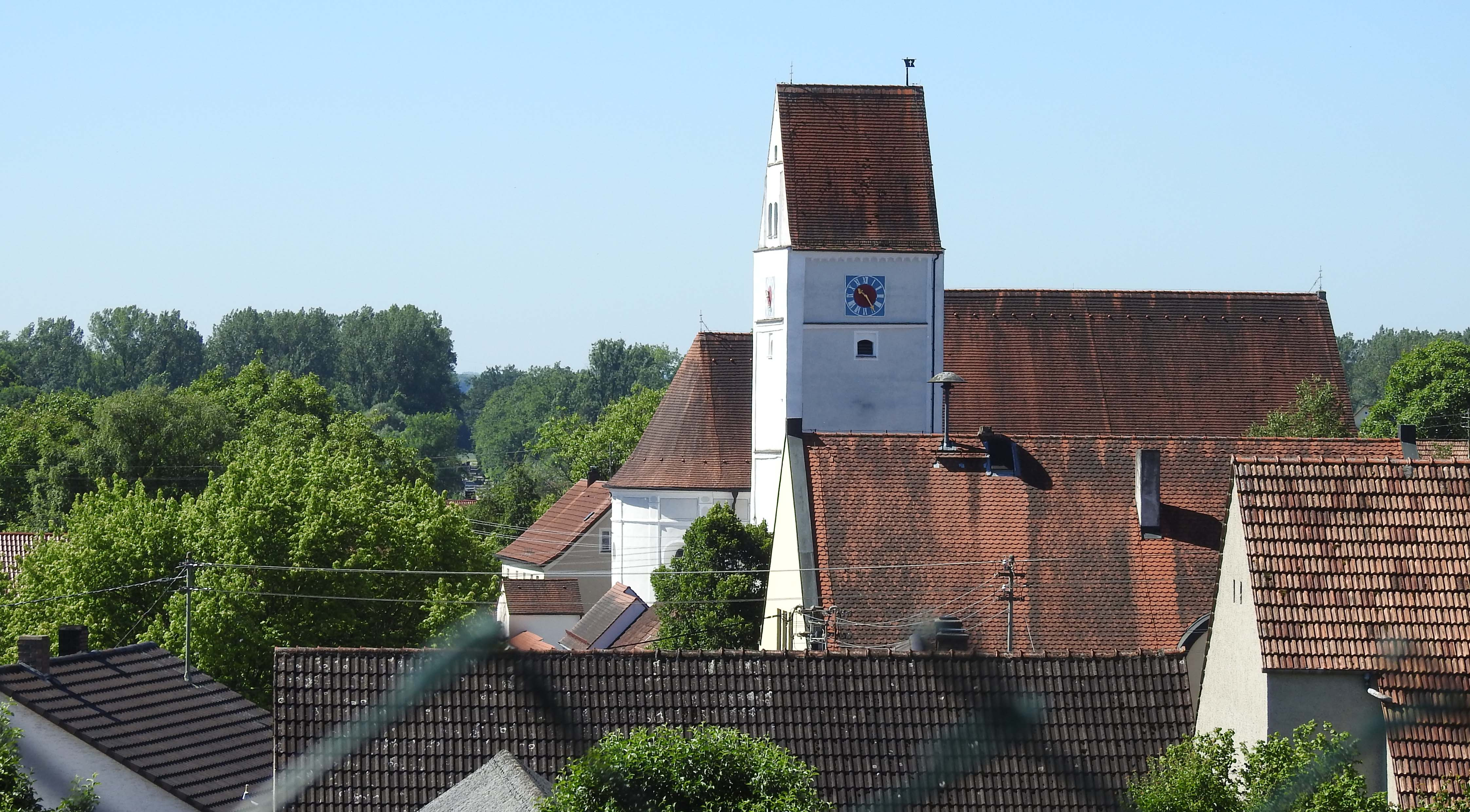
- Church of Saints Peter and Paul in Marxheim

- Coat of arms

- Location of Marxheim within Donau-Ries district
- Interactive map of Marxheim
- Location within Germany Location within Bavaria
- Coordinates: 48°45′N 10°57′E
- Country: Germany
- State: Bavaria
- Admin. region: Schwaben
- District: Donau-Ries

Government
  - Mayor (2020–26): Alois Schiegg

Area
  - Total: 46.46 km^{2} (17.94 sq mi)
- Elevation: 405 m (1,329 ft)

Population (2025-12-31)
  - Total: 2,571
  - Density: 55.34/km^{2} (143.3/sq mi)
- Time zone: UTC+01:00 (CET)
  - Summer (DST): UTC+02:00 (CEST)
- Postal codes: 86688
- Dialling codes: 09097
- Vehicle registration: DON
- Website: gemeinde-marxheim.de

Marxheim (Swabian: Marxa) is a municipality in the district of Donau-Ries in Bavaria in Germany. It lies on the river Danube.
