= Echenbrunn Abbey =

Monastery in Bavaria, Germany

Coordinates: 48°33′33″N 10°23′20″E

Echenbrunn Abbey (German: Kloster Echenbrunn) was a Benedictine monastery located at Echenbrunn, now part of Gundelfingen an der Donau in Bavaria, Germany.

Dedicated to Saints Peter and Paul, the monastery was founded in 1122 by Gumbert von Flochberg, a local noble. It was dissolved in 1556 by order of Otto Henry, Elector Palatine. In 1672 the Jesuits from Dillingen built a summer residence on the site, which later became the property of the Order of Saint John. The present structure on the site is a parish priest's house with a gabled roof built in 1732. The enclosure wall and its gateway with a pointed arch appear to date from the 16th century.

== See also ==
- List of Jesuit sites
