= Isen Abbey =

Coordinates: 48°12′44″N 12°03′28″E

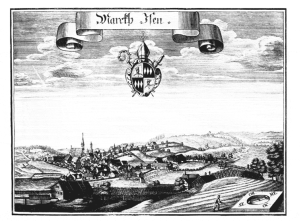
Engraving by Michael Wening in Topographia Bavariae, about 1700

Isen Abbey (Kloster Isen) was a Benedictine abbey, later a collegiate foundation, at Isen in Bavaria, Germany.

== History ==
Dedicated to Saint Zeno of Verona, the abbey was founded by members of the Fagana family, an indigenous Bavarian noble clan, and by Bishop Joseph of Freising (also known as Joseph of Verona) in the 8th century, about 752. It was one of the oldest monasteries on ancient Bavarian soil. Until the beginning of the 12th century it was Benedictine, but afterwards became a collegiate foundation.

It was dissolved during the secularisation of Bavaria in 1802. The premises and the abbey's seven farms passed into private ownership, while St. Zeno's church, with a house for the priest, became the parish church of Isen.

== Burials ==
- Joseph of Freising
