= St. Stephen's Abbey, Augsburg =

Abbey in Augsburg, Germany

Coordinates: 48°22′32″N 10°53′57″E

St. Stephen's Abbey, Augsburg (German: Kloster St. Stephan, formerly Stift St. Stephan) is a Benedictine monastery, formerly a house of Augustinian canonesses, in Augsburg in Bavaria, Germany.

== First foundation ==
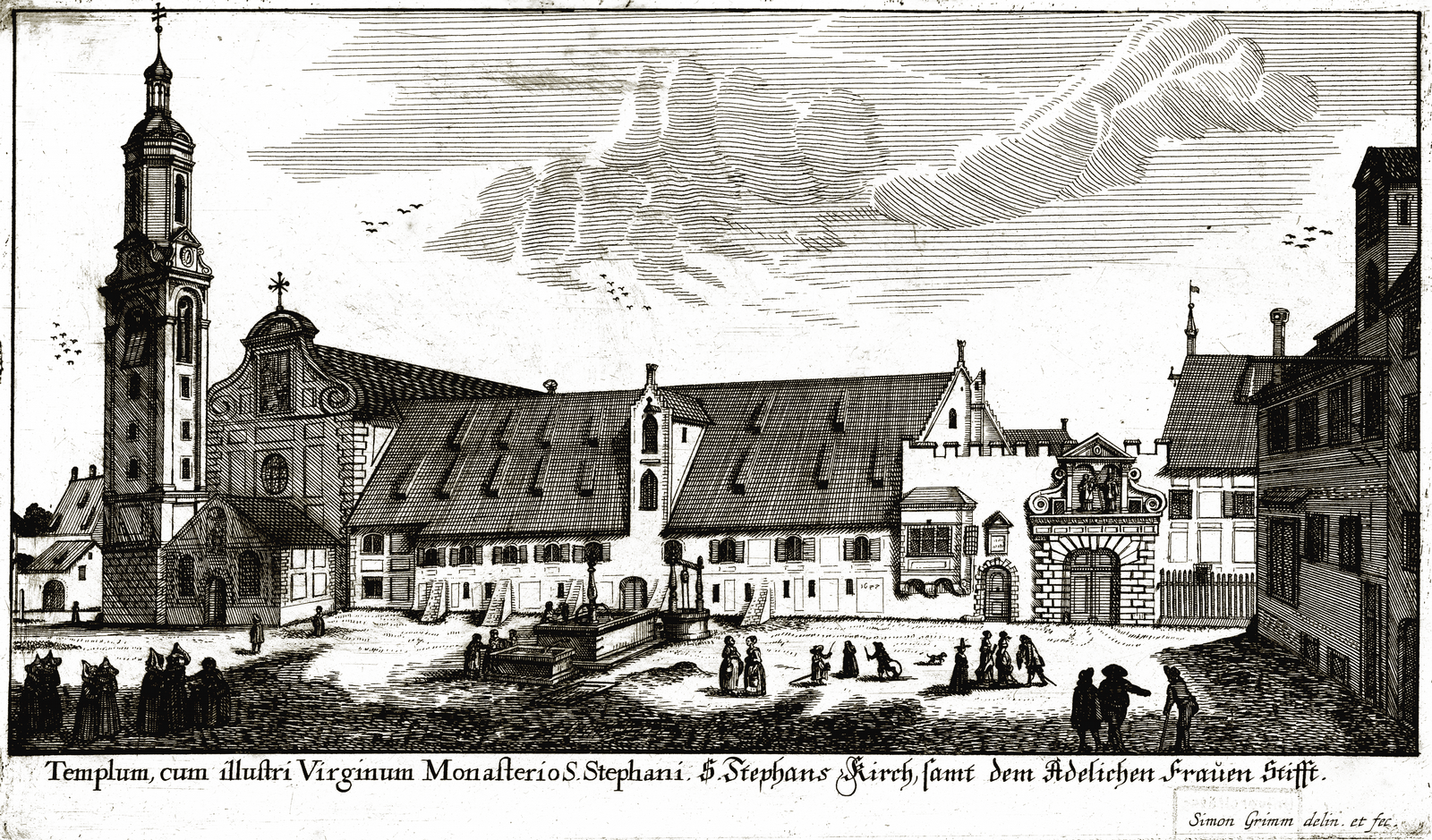
Church and monastery in 1683

The monastery, dedicated to Saint Stephen, was founded in 968 by Saint Ulrich, Bishop of Augsburg, and used by Augustinian canonesses. It was dissolved in the secularisation of Bavaria in 1803, and the premises passed into the possession of the town. The army used the site for a few years as a quartermaster's store.

== Second foundation ==
In 1828 King Ludwig I of Bavaria founded a grammar school here, as a successor to the former Jesuit college of St. Salvator (1582–1807). In 1835 he established the Benedictine monastery and entrusted it with the running of the school. Barnabas Huber, who had been staying with Prince Fugger of Babenhusen since the closing of Ottobeuren Abbey was selected as the first abbot. In company with Ignatius Albert von Riegg, Bishop of Augsburg (1824–36), he traveled to Benedictine monasteries in Austria and Switzerland, and returned with about twenty monks to make up the new community. As the house began to grow, many of them returned to their respective abbeys. Huber's installation as abbot took place in November 1835. The monks took up teaching at the Royal Lyceum, the Catholic Gymnasium, and the seminary.

The buildings were entirely destroyed in 1944 but have been re-built.

The monks continue to run the school and boarding house, and are engaged in pastoral and youth work.

The abbey belongs to the Bavarian Congregation of the Benedictine Confederation.
