= Braunau in Rohr Abbey =

Abbey in Bavaria, Germany

Coordinates: 48°46′08″N 11°58′01″E

Braunau in Rohr Abbey (Kloster Braunau in Rohr) is a Benedictine monastery, formerly Rohr Abbey, a monastery of the Augustinian Canons, in Rohr in Niederbayern in the district of Kelheim in Bavaria, Germany.

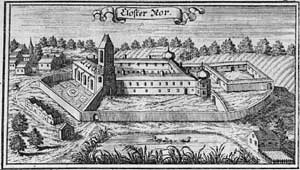
Engraving of Rohr Abbey from the "Churbaierische Atlas" of Anton Wilhelm Ertl, 1687

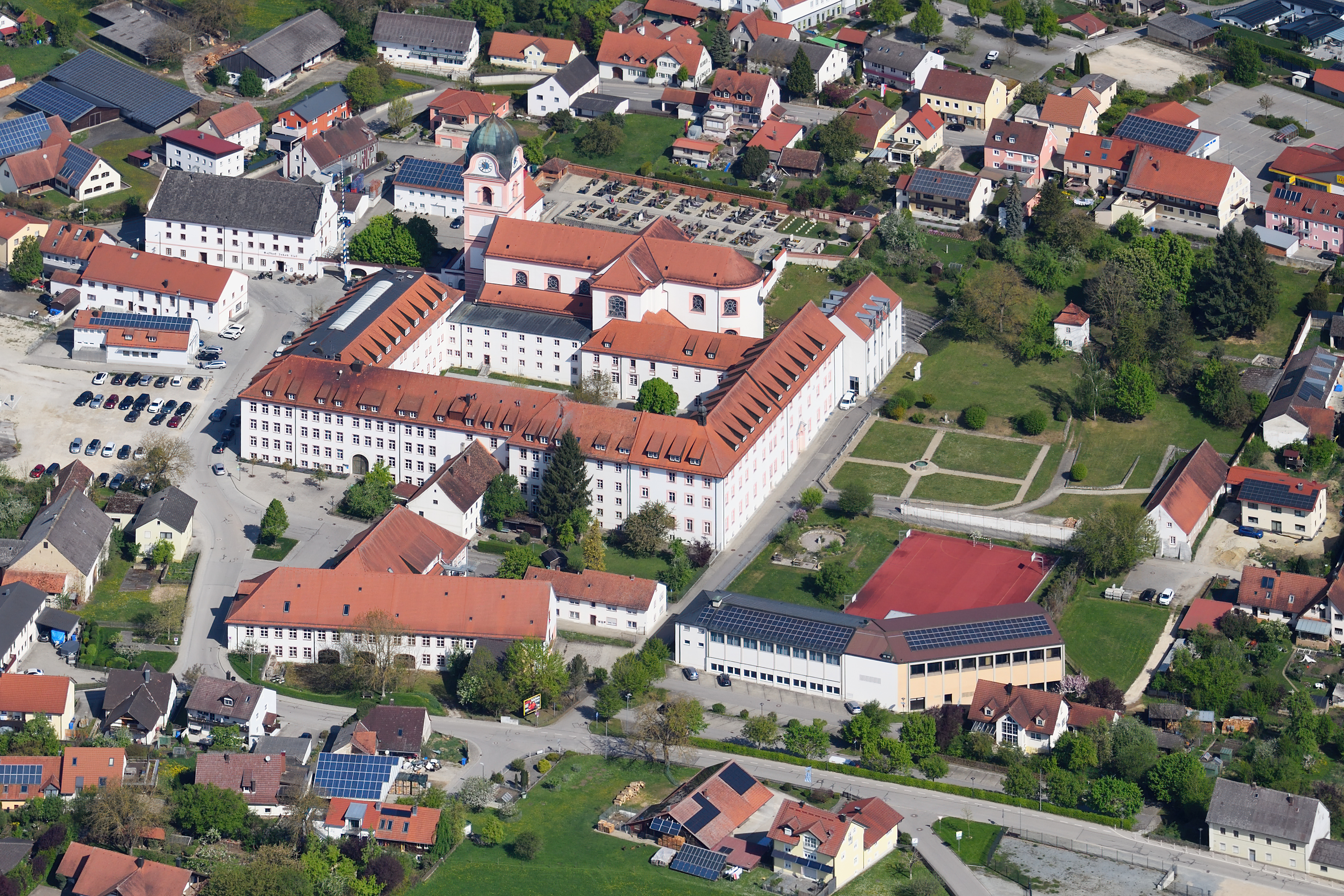
Aerial view

== Rohr Abbey: First foundation ==
The monastery, dedicated to the Assumption of the Blessed Virgin Mary, was founded in 1133 by Adalbert of Rohr. It was dissolved in the secularization of 1803 when the German princes substituted church lands for property they had lost through Napoleon. In the east wing the parish priest's offices and a school were accommodated, and in a part of the west wing, an inn. The remaining buildings were demolished.

== Abbey church ==
The abbey church, dedicated, like the abbey, to the Assumption, contains a high altar, which represents the Assumption of the Virgin in fully three-dimensional sculpture: a "Theatrum sacrum". It was created by Egid Quirin Asam in 1722 and 1723.

== Braunau in Rohr Abbey: Second foundation ==
After World War II the exiled German Benedictine monks from Braunau Abbey (Braunau is now Broumov in the Czech Republic) were lodged here in part of the east wing. They gradually re-established their community, acquiring little by little the remaining parts of the entire monastery complex. The monks have re-established a secondary school here.

The abbey has been part of the Bavarian Congregation of the Benedictine Confederation since 1984.
