= Weissenohe Abbey =

Monastery in Weissenohe, Germany

Coordinates: 49°37′46″N 11°15′12″E

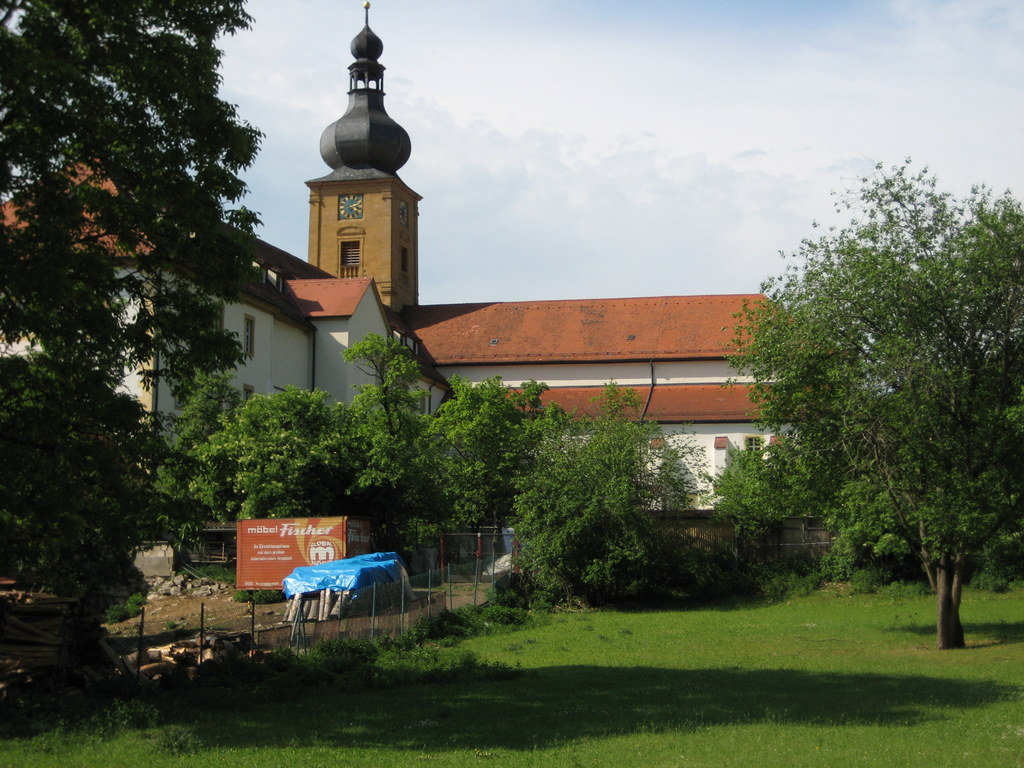
Weissenohe Abbey

Weissenohe Abbey (German: Kloster Weißenohe) was a Benedictine monastery in Weissenohe in the district of Forchheim in Bavaria, Germany.

== History ==
The monastery, dedicated to Saint Boniface, was founded by Aribo IV, Count ("Pfalzgraf") of the Chiemgau. In 1692 construction of the present abbey church was begun, to plans by Wolfgang Dietzenhofer (1648-1706).

The abbey was dissolved in 1803 during the secularisation of Bavaria. The abbey buildings were sold in 1804 and in 1850 demolished except for a single range. Work on the abbey church finished only in 1907.

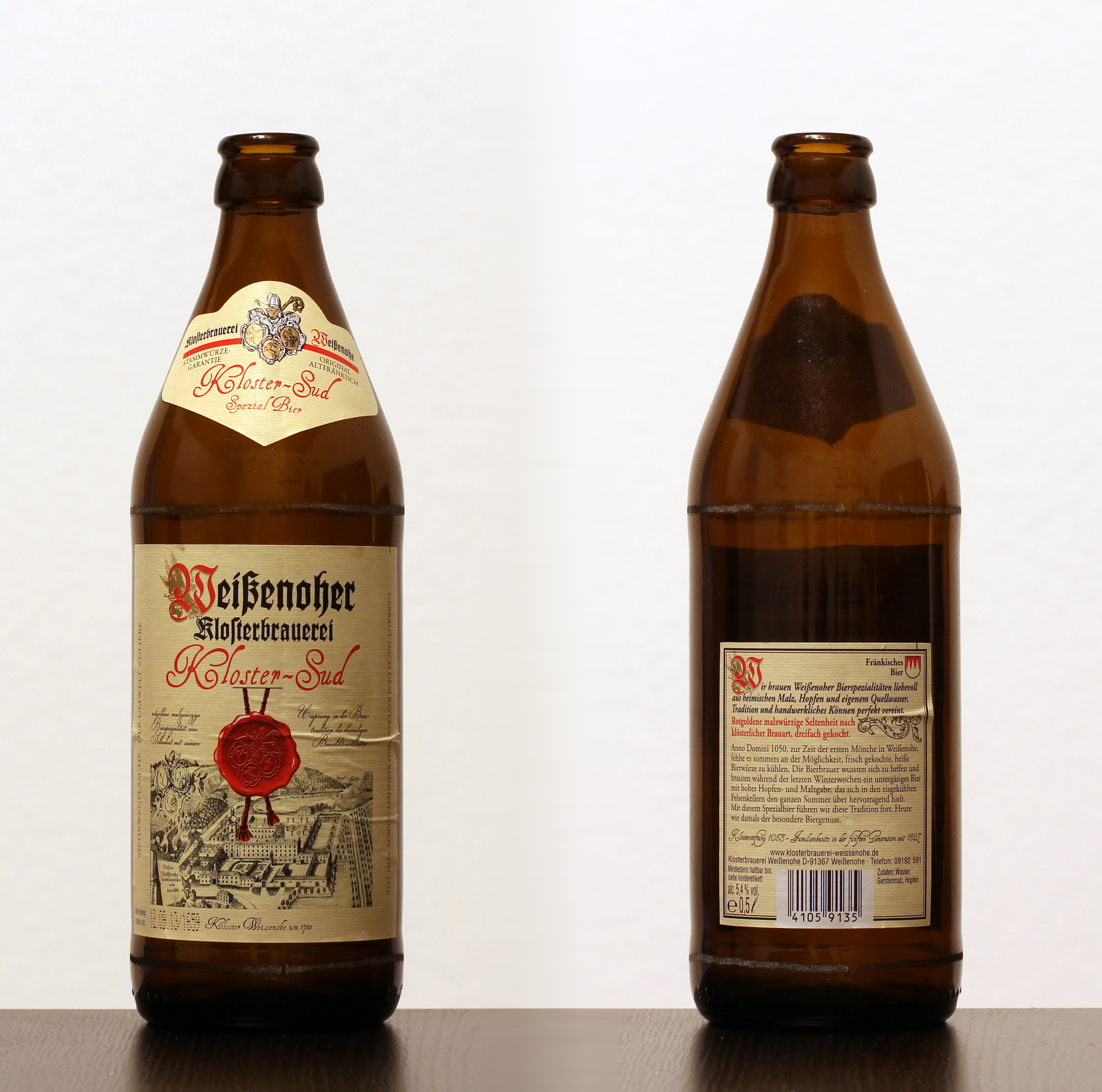
Weissenoher Klosterbrauerei Kloster-Sud

The surviving premises are now used for offices and cafés, and for the beer garden of the brewery named after the abbey.
