= Attel Abbey =

Former Benedictine monastery in Bavaria

Coordinates: 48°01′25″N 12°10′32″E

- Kloster Attel
- Interactive map of Attel Abbey

Monastery information
- Other name: Attl Abbey
- Order: Benedictine
- Denomination: Roman Catholic
- Established: c. 1037
- Disestablished: 1803
- Dedication: Virgin Mary and Saint Michael
- Archdiocese: München-Freising

People
- Founder: Count Arnold of Diessen-Andechs

Architecture
- Status: Dissolved
- Functional status: Converted (later used as a home for the disabled)

Site
- Location: Attel, near Wasserburg am Inn, Bavaria
- Country: Germany
- Visible remains: Buildings partly demolished, remaining premises used for care facility

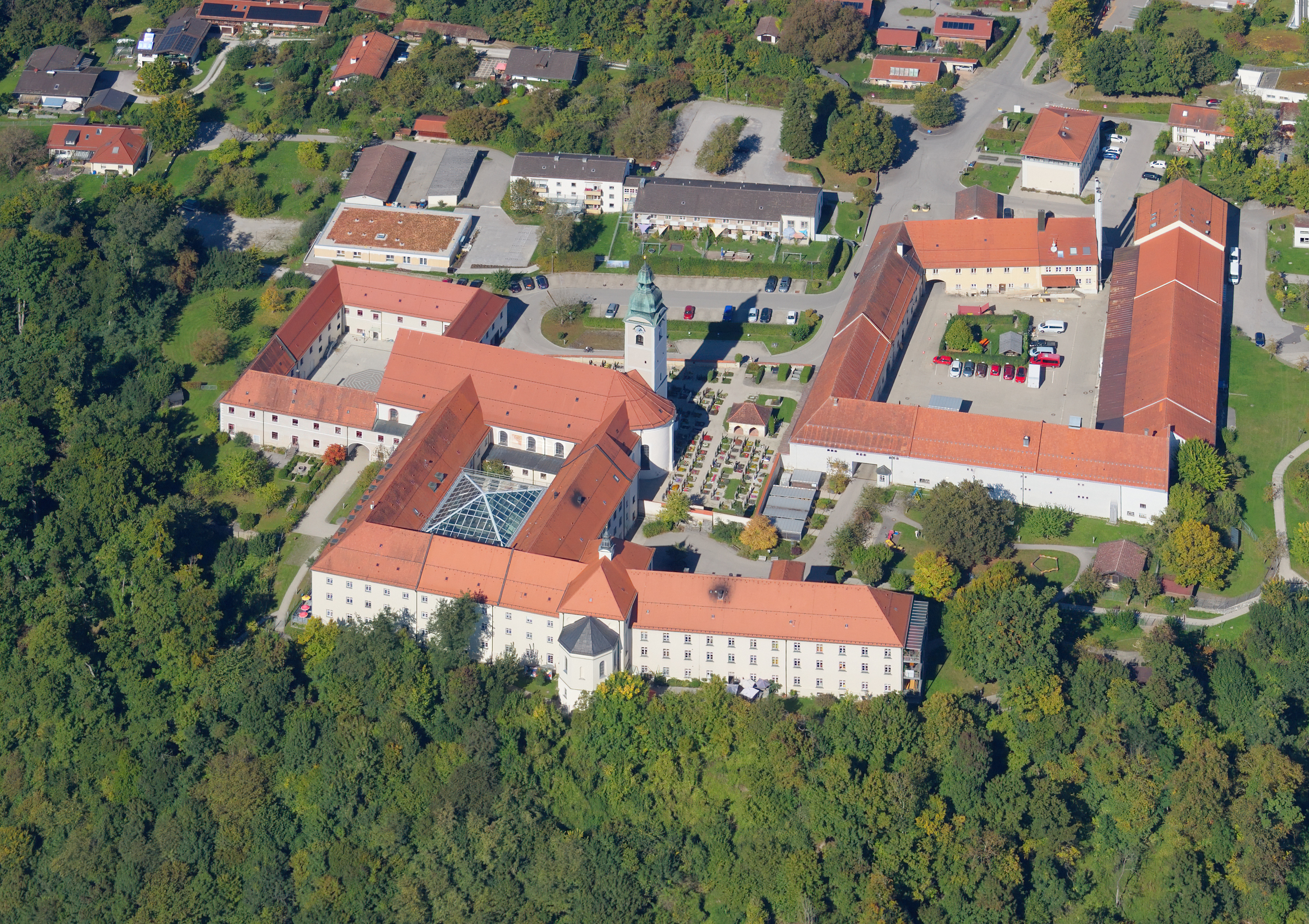
Aerial view of Attel Abbey

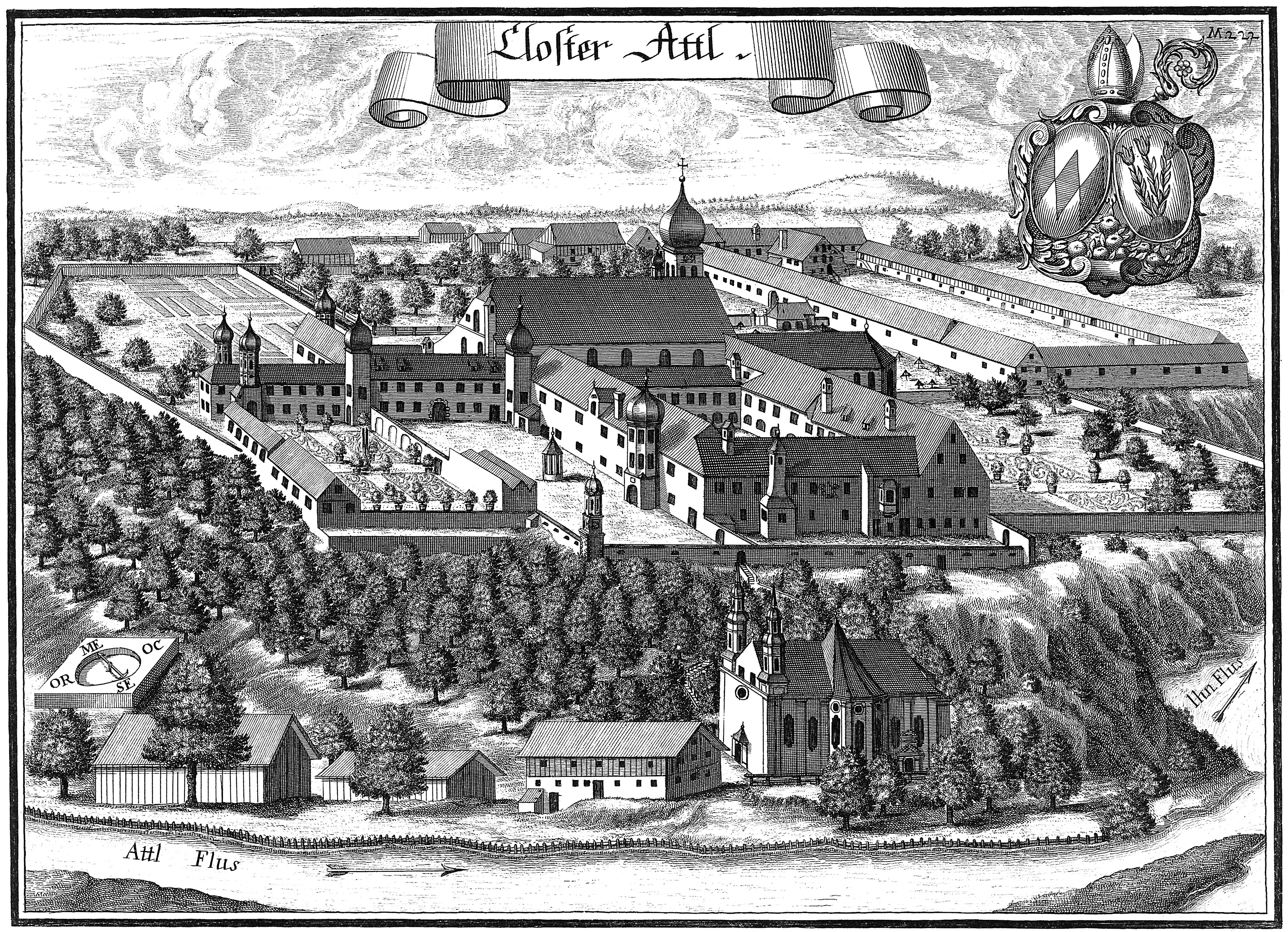
Engraving by Michael Wening in Topographia Bavariae from c. 1700

Attel Abbey, also Attl Abbey (German: Kloster Attel or Attl), was a Benedictine monastery, later a home for the disabled run by the Brothers Hospitallers, in the village of Attel near Wasserburg am Inn in Bavaria, Germany.

== History ==
The monastery, dedicated to the Virgin Mary and Saint Michael, was founded as a Benedictine abbey by Count Arnold of Diessen-Andechs in around 1037.

It was dissolved in 1803 in the secularisation of Bavaria. The abbey buildings were partly demolished, partly acquired by private owners.

In 1874 the Bavarian government set up a home for disabled men in the remaining premises, the running of which they entrusted to the Order of the Brothers Hospitallers. Apart from the years of World War II, when under the National Socialist government the Brothers were obliged to close the home and leave, they remained here until 1970, when declining numbers forced them to give up Attel. The running of the home was taken over by the Charity Union of Munich-Freising until 1994, when it became independently managed.
