= Kaisheim =

- Municipality
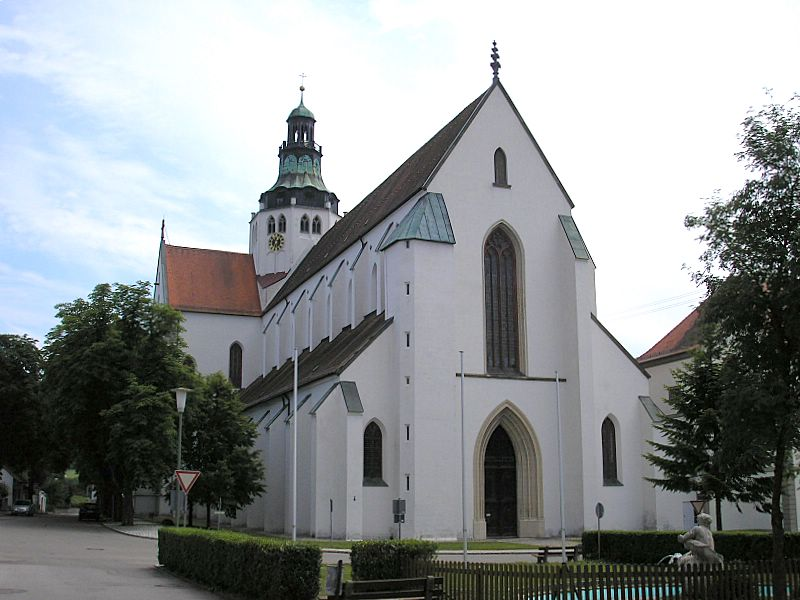
- Church of the Assumption of the Virgin Mary

- Coat of arms

- Location of Kaisheim within Donau-Ries district
- Interactive map of Kaisheim
- Location within Germany Location within Bavaria
- Coordinates: 48°46′06″N 10°47′47″E
- Country: Germany
- State: Bavaria
- Admin. region: Schwaben
- District: Donau-Ries

Government
  - Mayor (2020–26): Martin Scharr

Area
  - Total: 41.73 km^{2} (16.11 sq mi)
- Elevation: 470 m (1,540 ft)

Population (2025-12-31)
  - Total: 3,999
  - Density: 95.83/km^{2} (248.2/sq mi)
- Time zone: UTC+01:00 (CET)
  - Summer (DST): UTC+02:00 (CEST)
- Postal codes: 86687
- Dialling codes: 09099
- Vehicle registration: DON
- Website: www.kaisheim.de

Kaisheim (German pronunciation: [ˈkaɪshaɪm]) is a municipality in the district of Donau-Ries in Bavaria in Germany. It was the location of Kaisheim Abbey.

== History ==
Kaisheim was the local High Reeve's office and belonged to Kaisheim Abbey, an Imperial Abbey. The Abbey was founded in 1133 by Graf Heinrich III von Lechsgemünd and his wife Liutgard. The abbey was likely given Imperial Abbey status before 1370, however it was not until 1656 that the Imperial immediacy was recognized.

Since the German Mediatisation of 1803, Kaisheim has belonged to Bavaria and from the Bavarian reform edict of 1818 the present day community arose. Kaisheim was given market rights and is sometimes referred to as Markt Kaisheim.

The Latin title given to the town was "Caesarea" from "Kaisersheim".

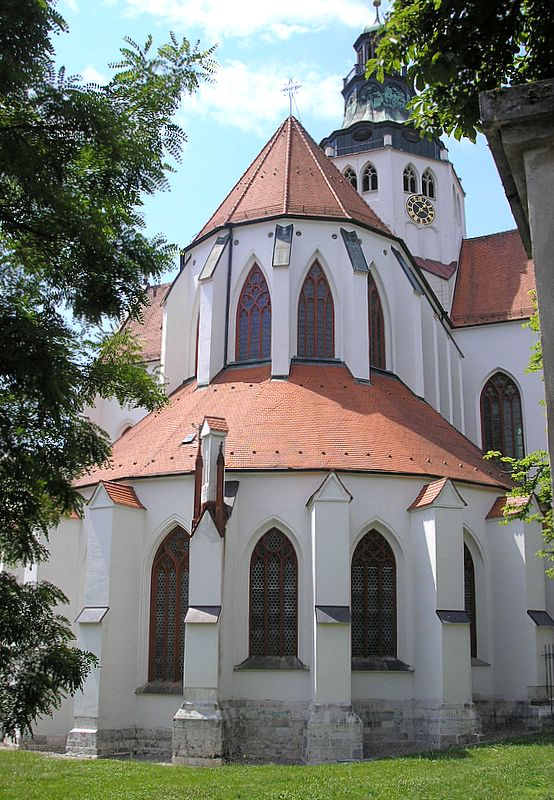
Kaisheim Abbey

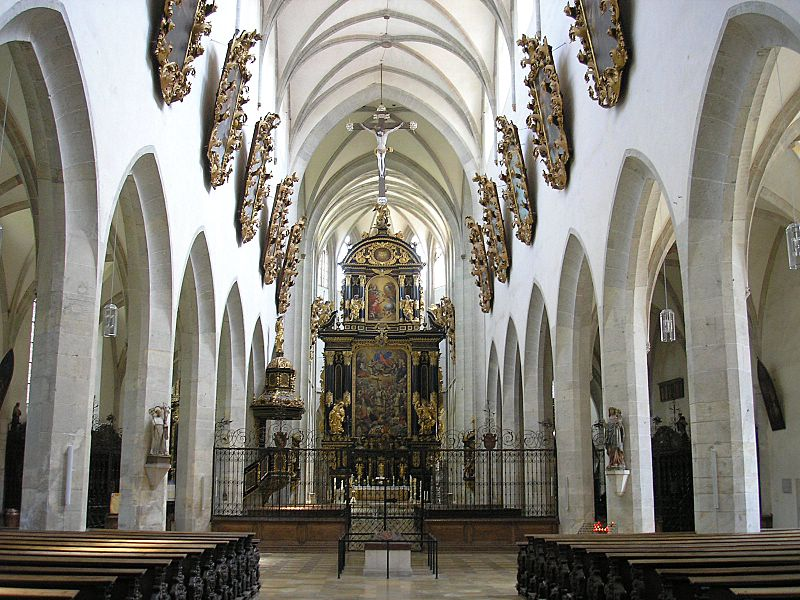
Kaisheim Abbey

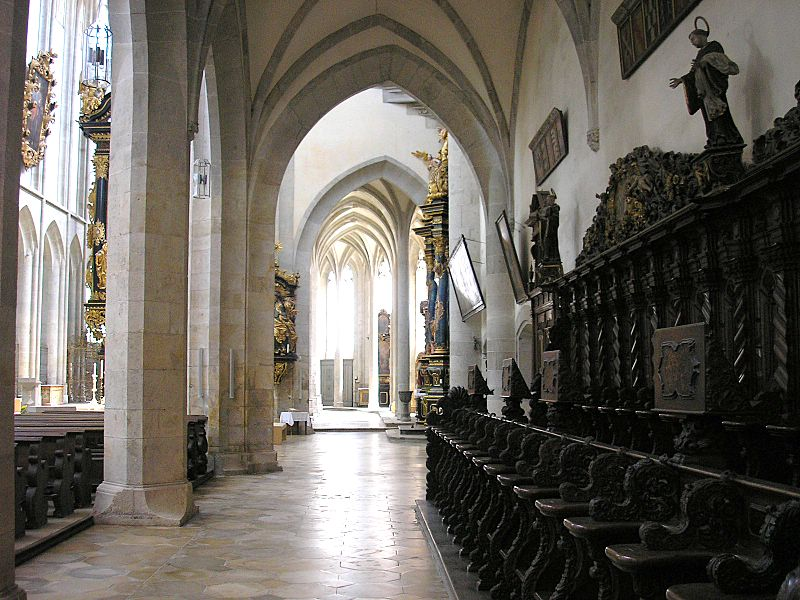
Kaisheim Abbey

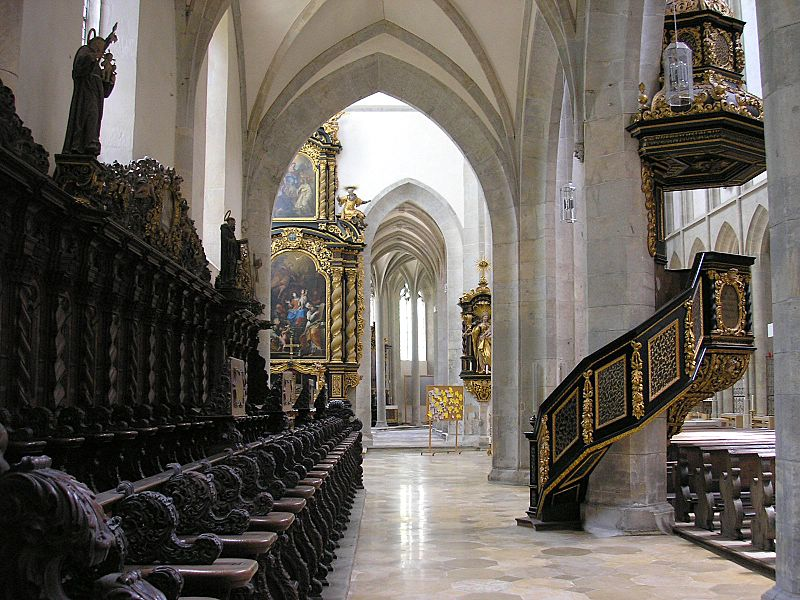
Kaisheim Abbey

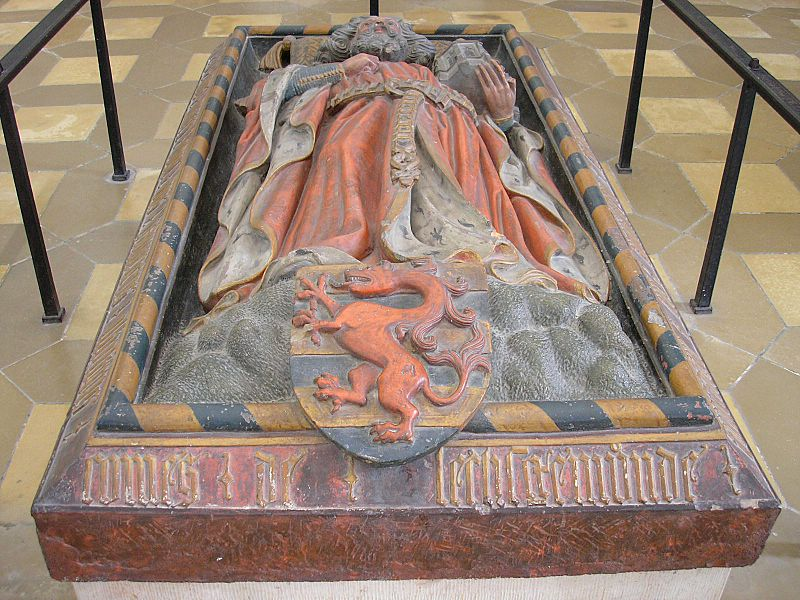
Kaisheim's Founder's Grave

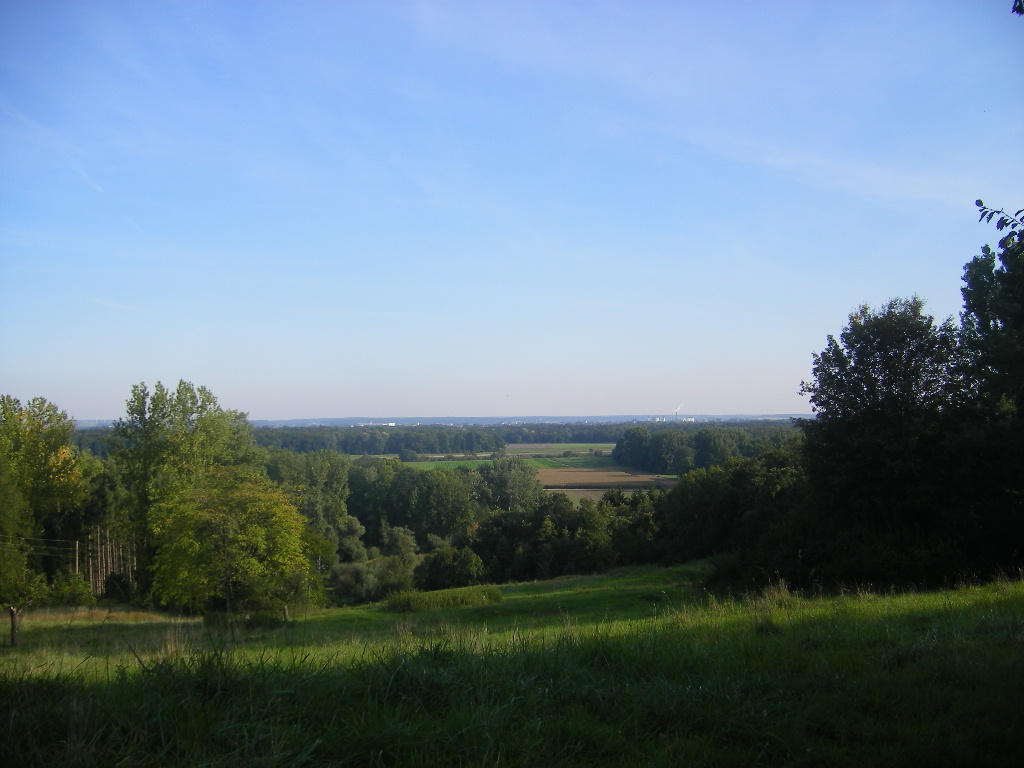
