= Walderbach =

- Municipality
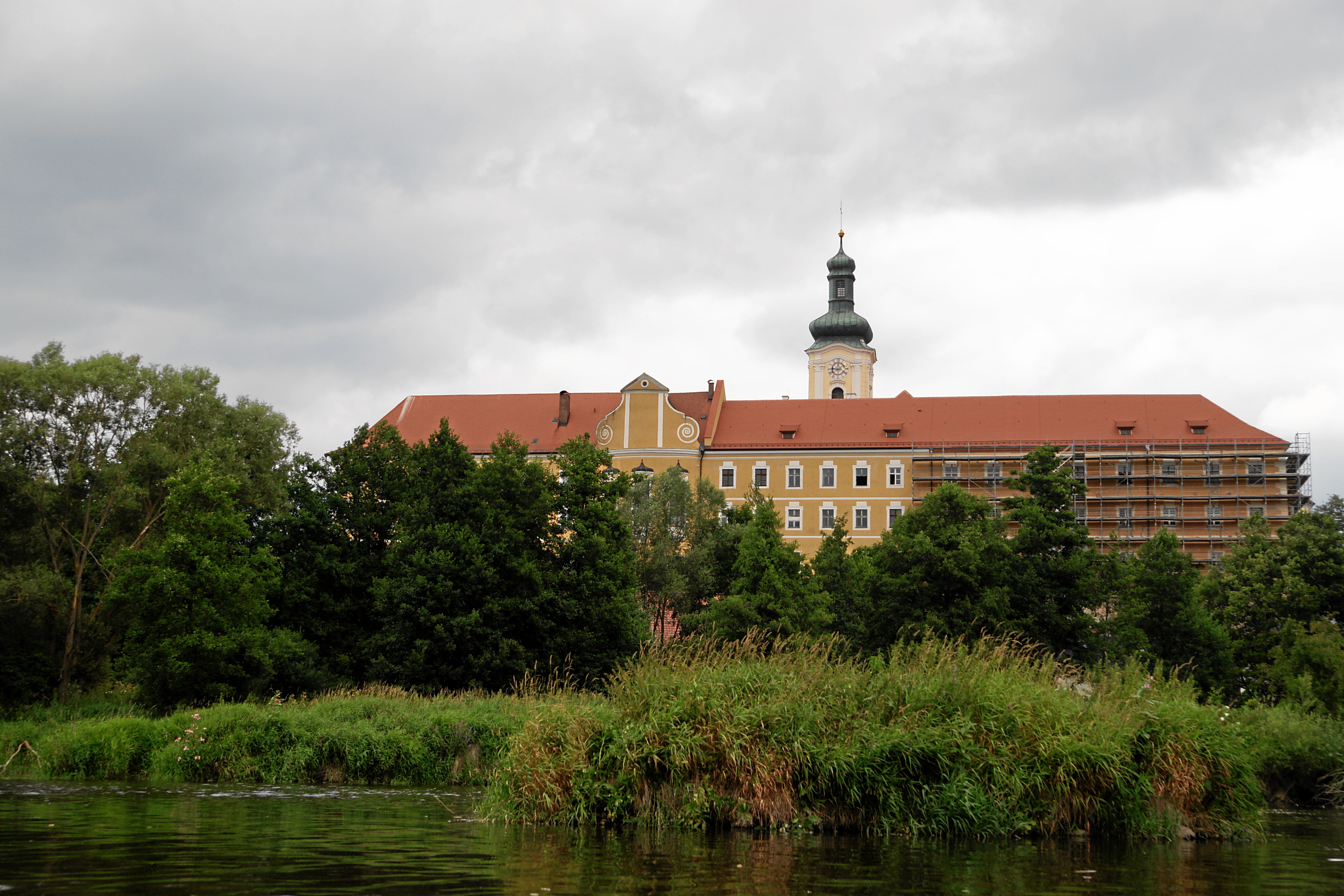
- Walderbach Abbey

- Coat of arms

- Location of Walderbach within Cham district
- Interactive map of Walderbach
- Location within Germany Location within Bavaria
- Coordinates: 49°11′N 12°23′E
- Country: Germany
- State: Bavaria
- Admin. region: Oberpfalz
- District: Cham
- Municipal assoc.: Walderbach

Government
  - Mayor (2020–26): Michael Schwarzfischer

Area
  - Total: 27.08 km^{2} (10.46 sq mi)
- Elevation: 369 m (1,211 ft)

Population (2025-12-31)
  - Total: 2,328
  - Density: 85.97/km^{2} (222.7/sq mi)
- Time zone: UTC+01:00 (CET)
  - Summer (DST): UTC+02:00 (CEST)
- Postal codes: 93194
- Dialling codes: 0 94 64
- Vehicle registration: CHA
- Website: www.walderbach.de

Walderbach is a municipality in the district of Cham in Bavaria in Germany.
