= Isen, Bavaria =

Isen
- Municipality
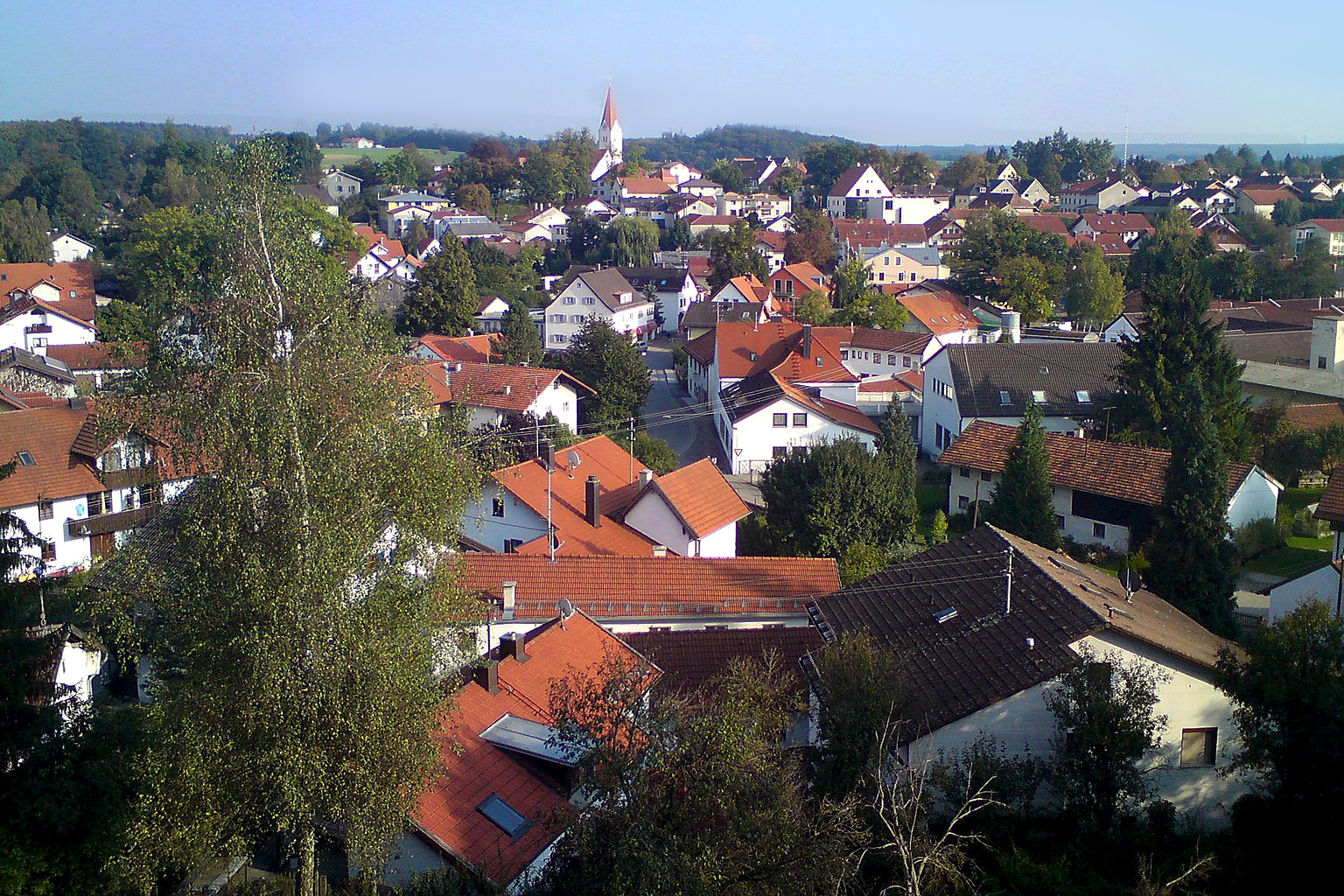
- Central part of Isen seen from the north

- Coat of arms

- Location of Isen within Erding district
- Interactive map of Isen
- Location within Germany Location within Bavaria
- Coordinates: 48°13′N 12°4′E
- Country: Germany
- State: Bavaria
- Admin. region: Oberbayern
- District: Erding

Government
  - Mayor (2020–26): Irmgard Hibler (FW)

Area
  - Total: 43.78 km^{2} (16.90 sq mi)
- Elevation: 519 m (1,703 ft)

Population (2025-12-31)
  - Total: 5,581
  - Density: 127.5/km^{2} (330.2/sq mi)
- Time zone: UTC+01:00 (CET)
  - Summer (DST): UTC+02:00 (CEST)
- Postal codes: 84424
- Dialling codes: 08083
- Vehicle registration: ED
- Website: www.isen.de

Isen (German pronunciation: [ˈiːzn̩]) is a municipality in the district of Erding in Bavaria, Germany.

Isen was once home to a Benedictine abbey. The abbey was dissolved however during the secularisation in 1802 and only the church of St. Zeno remains today.

In 2022 Isen had a population of 5,769.
