= Industrialization in Germany =

Aspect of Germany's history

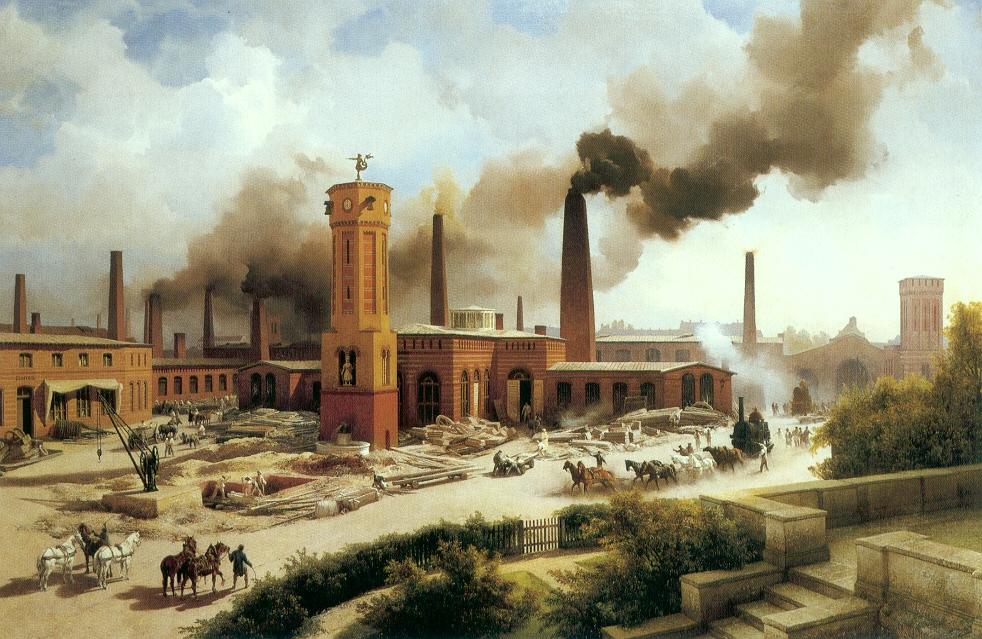
Locomotive factory of August Borsig in Berlin (around 1845)

Industrialization in Germany was the phase of the breakthrough of industrialization in Germany, beginning at the time from around 1815 to 1835. This period was preceded by the periods of pre-industrialization and early industrialization. In general, the decades between the 1830s and 1873 (Gründerzeit, or "Founders' Years") are considered the phase of industrial take off. The Industrial Revolution was followed by the phase of high industrialization during the German Empire. The (catch-up) Industrial Revolution in Germany differed from that of the pioneering country of Great Britain in that the key industries became not the textile industry but coal production, steel production and railroad construction.

Another characteristic was the regional character of industrialization. Partly against the background of older traditions, partly because of favorable locations (e.g., on trade routes, rivers, canals, near raw material deposits or sales markets) or for other reasons, the Industrial Revolution was concentrated in a few regional concentration zones. In some older industrial areas, where adaptation to the new era was not successful, processes of economic decline occurred. Initially, industrial development was too weak to create significant new jobs for a growing population. On the contrary, industrial competition initially exacerbated the crisis in crafts and many traditional trades. This was one of the causes of the pauperism of the Vormärz. Only with the breakthrough of the Industrial Revolution did new job opportunities arise on a larger scale. As it progressed, the social question shifted away from the rural lower classes and toward the growing working population with its poor working conditions and often low wages.

== Pre-, early- and proto-industrialization ==
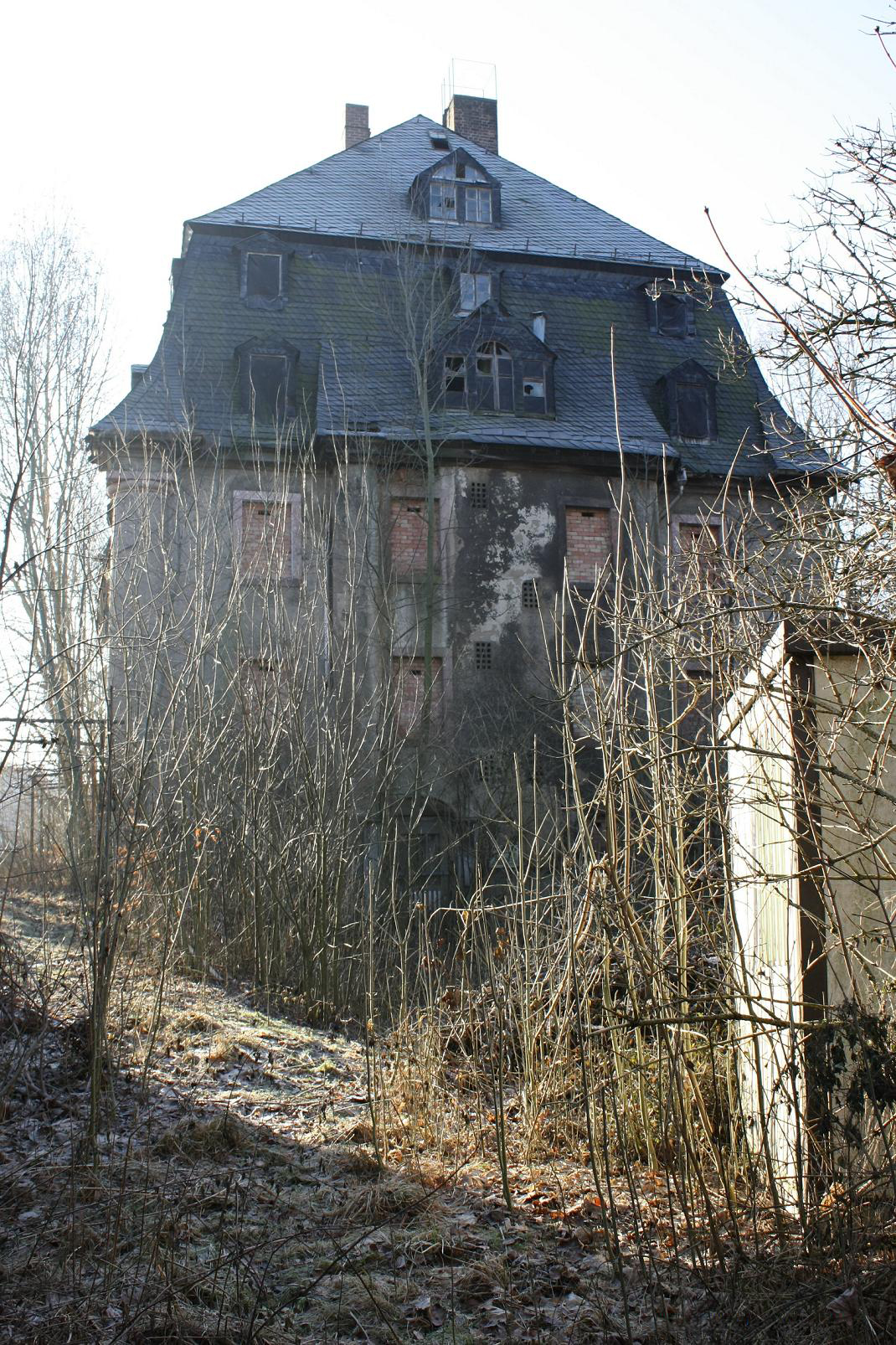
The Meinert spinning mill in Lugau near Chemnitz from 1812, one of the earliest factory buildings in Germany. Demolished in August 2016.

The initial situation for an Industrial Revolution was significantly worse in Germany than in the country of origin of industrialization, Great Britain. This included the lack of a single market, the large number of customs duties and currencies and the territorial fragmentation of the Holy Roman Empire, which had collapsed in 1806. In terms of infrastructure, the empire was significantly less developed than England, and there was also a lack of overseas trade and colonial expansion. The gap to Great Britain was also evident in Germany's much larger agricultural sector. Moreover, no comparable "agricultural revolution" had yet taken place in this sector at the beginning of the 19th century. There were still strong feudal elements and, with the exception of East Elbia, numerous low-performing small farms, many of which still operated using old methods and were barely connected to the market as subsistence farms. There were also other aspects. Despite mercantilism in the 18th century, for example, the guilds and corporations in the crafts sector held on to old instruments of economic regulation.

But there had also been preparatory developments in the German states since the early modern period. Werner Conze narrowed down a preparatory phase to roughly the period between 1770 and 1850. This included stronger population growth that began in the middle of the 18th century. This increased demand and enlarged the potential labor force.

=== Protoindustry and cottage industry ===
Although the guild crafts were in crisis around 1800, there were not only stagnant developments in the commercial sector either. In the manufactories with a workforce of about 100,000, there was already a kind of mass production with division of labor to a certain extent. The putting-out system (proto-industry) had already emerged in some regions in the late Middle Ages and especially in the early modern period. For example, the land-poor classes in eastern Westphalia and other areas specialized in the cottage industry production of linen, which was bought up by merchants and marketed on the national market. It is estimated that as many as one million people were employed in this sector around 1800.

These and other developments, including in the iron and metal trades and other areas, had already given rise to various regional centers of commercial concentration. In the western Prussian provinces of the Rhineland and Westphalia, for example, these were Bergisches Land, the County of Mark and the Siegerland region with spurs into the Sauerland. Similar contexts existed in the Rhineland, where iron from the Eifel region was processed between Aachen, Eschweiler, Stolberg and Düren. Above all, however, brass, zinc and lead production was concentrated in this area. In Upper Silesia, mining and processing were run partly by the state and partly by large landowners. These included the Counts of Donnersmarck or the Princes of Hohenlohe. In the Kingdom of Saxony, a highly differentiated trade existed, ranging from rural and urban crafts to cottage industries, manufactories, mining and, soon, the first factories. Large parts of Saxony – here above all the Chemnitz region, which was later also called Saxon Manchester – were even among the most growth-intensive regions in Europe, as was the northern Rhineland, according to Hahn. Rhenish manufacturing also benefitted from the Napoleonic Wars as French rule brought the abolition of old guild restrictions as well as access to the large market of the French Empire and its military, whose blockade of Britain also removed competition from British goods.

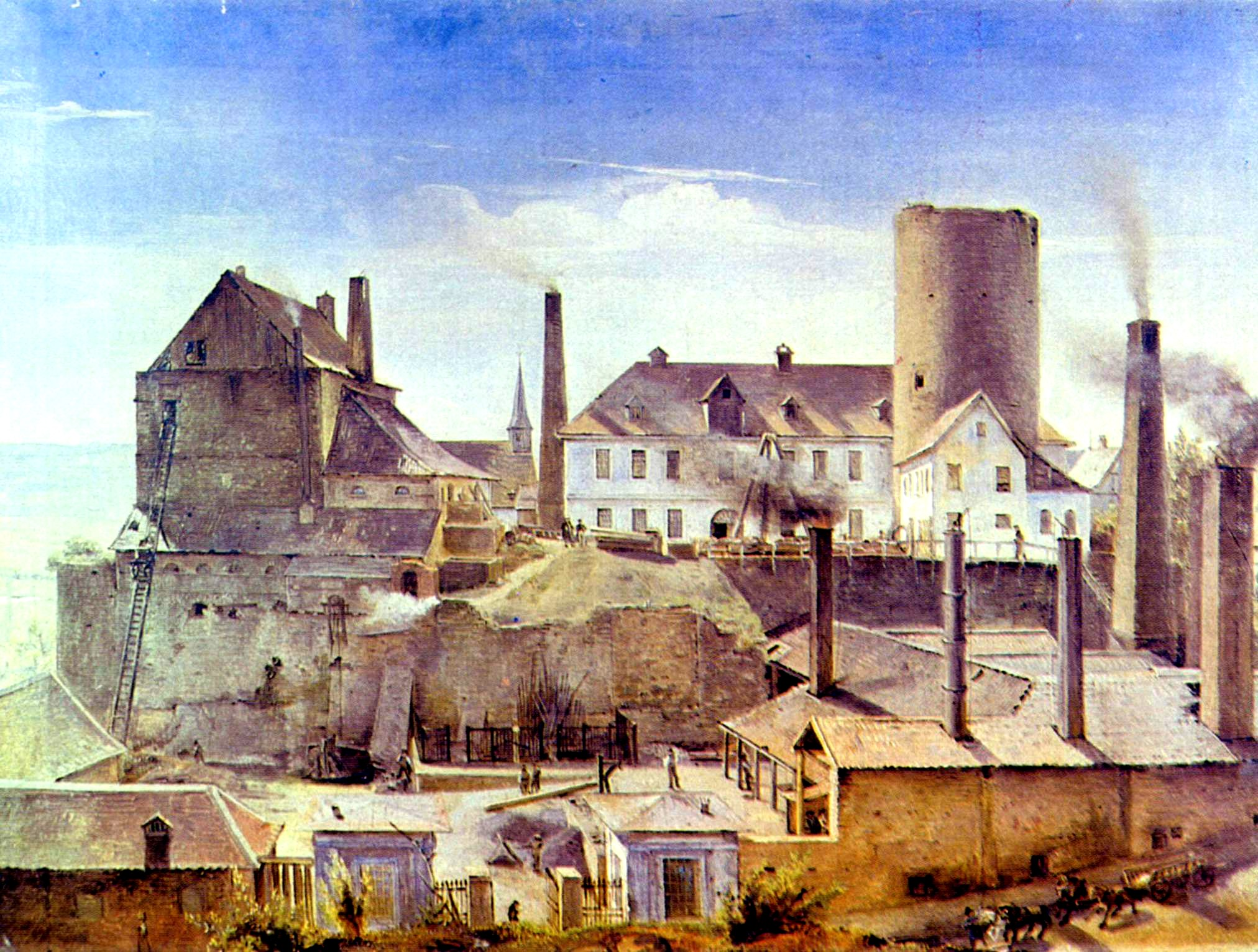
Mechanical workshops of Friedrich Harkort in the ruins of Wetter Castle

In connection with manufactories and publishing houses, trading capital accumulated in the various landscapes, which was later used to finance the first large factories. However, these early trade landscapes were not always a direct precursor to industrial development. In some cases, such as in parts of Hesse or in Lower Silesia, the connection to industrialization was not successful and in the areas of rural trade there were processes of economic decline.

=== Early industrialization ===
The German Customs Union. Blue: at the time of foundation. Green/yellow: extensions up to/after 1866

Approaches to industrial expansion thus existed at the latest since the beginning of the 19th century. Nevertheless, it makes sense to let the early industrialization in the sense of immediate prehistory of the Industrial Revolution in Germany begin approximately with the year 1815. Since the end of the Napoleonic Wars and the lifting of the Continental Blockade, trade barriers fell on the one hand, and on the other, the German economy was now exposed to direct competition with British industry. This significantly increased the pressure to adapt. In addition, the territorial upheaval following the Reichsdeputationshauptschluss led to the disappearance of numerous micro-territories and the emergence of a number of medium-sized states. But there was still no unified economic area. An important institutional factor for commercial development was the founding of the German customs union (Zollverein) in 1834, which enabled the duty-free exchange of goods within the treaty area. This was a key prerequisite for the integration of previously regionally related markets into a larger context. However, Zollverein's direct support for industrial development was limited. Although industrial development was facilitated by it, no decisive growth impulses emanated from it. Saxony's industrial growth relied on overseas markets such as North America, and avoided direct British competition by focusing on niches in the market where Saxony could leverage its low-cost labour. Equally important were numerous other reforms in the areas of state, society, and economy. Particularly well known are the Prussian reforms, which had similarly taken place in other states. These included the liberation of peasants and reforms in trade legislation. Depending on the state, however, implementation dragged on well into the middle of the century.

As early as the end of the 18th century, the first modern factories emerged in Germany, in addition to cottage industries and manufactories. In 1784, for example, the first mechanical cotton spinning mill, the Cromford textile factory, went into operation in Ratingen, and a year later the first steam engine in the mining industry went into operation in Hettstedt. In 1796, the first continuously producing coke oven was built at the Royal Prussian Iron Foundry in Gleiwitz. In 1798, C. F. Bernhardt's spinning mill was founded in Chemnitz-Harthau. Among other things, it cleared the way for industrial development in the region. In the years that followed, countless spinning mills based on Bernhardt's pattern were built in Chemnitz and the surrounding area. However, these early beginnings did not achieve a broad impact, but remained isolated.

Most of the factory-like operations were relatively simple, not yet using steam power. Spinning machines for yarn production, in particular, made the start; mechanical looms were added in the textile production sector from the 1830s onward. On the whole, the early industrialization approaches were based on the production of simple consumer goods and the processing of agricultural products (linen and wool manufactories, distilleries, breweries, oil mills, or tobacco factories). Relatively early on, some larger spinning mills were established in Baden, such as the spinning mills in St. Blasien with 28,000 spindles or the similarly large Ettlinger Spinnerei AG. A largely new branch of the textile industry in the early 19th century was cotton processing. Saxony took the leading position, followed by Prussia and Baden. The center in Prussia was the Düsseldorf region and in particular, the Bergisches Land region, which had already been on the threshold of the Industrial Revolution around 1800 on the basis of small iron and textile industries. In Rheydt and Gladbach alone there were 16 spinning mills in 1836. The textile industry as a whole was one of the first industries to be industrialized. Unlike in England, however, it was not a leading sector of the Industrial Revolution. Its growth was too small for that.

The phase of the early industrial boom that began after 1815 ended as early as the mid-1840s when the agrarian crisis and the effects of the revolution of 1848/49 severely impaired development. This period saw the peak of pre-March pauperism and the last agrarian crisis of the "old-type" (Wilhelm Abel).

== The Industrial Revolution ==
The revolution of 1848/49 also roughly marks the dividing line between early industrialization and the Industrial Revolution. This also fits with a change from crisis-ridden self-confidence in the 1840s to a general mood of optimism in the following decade. From around this time, social production per inhabitant increased tenfold compared to the pre-industrial era.

An important indicator of the beginning of the Industrial Revolution in the 1850s was the sudden increase in the use of hard coal. Behind this were various growth processes: a sharp rise in iron and especially steel production, the increased construction of machinery, not least locomotives, and the increase in the transport services of the railroads caused energy demand to rise. The growing demand for fuel and industrial goods led to further expansion of the rail network and in turn increased demand for new locomotives and rails. Overall, too, the Industrial Revolution in the 1850s and 1860s was characterized primarily by investment in railroad construction and heavy industry.

=== Decline of the old crafts ===
However, the overall economic development during this period was not just a success story. Rather, the import of machine-made goods, especially from Great Britain, and the emergence of factories in Germany itself meant a threat to the existing older economic forms. This was true for iron products made with charcoal, as well as for textiles produced in manufactories or in the publishing system. The linen trade in particular lost importance because of the cheaper cotton products. The existence of the most important branch of the German textile industry was thus threatened.

For a time, the older production methods were able to hold on. In some cases, this was done quite successfully by specializing in particular products. Elsewhere, publishers responded by lowering the fees paid to home weavers. In the long term, however, many trades were unable to withstand the competition from machines – except in a few areas of retreat. As a result, if the older trades failed to make the transition to factory industry, they lacked job opportunities and could be subject to deindustrialization and reagriculturalization processes.

Another crisis factor was the craft sector. Due to the population growth in the first half of the century, the number of craftsmen increased sharply. Some mass trades, such as tailoring or shoemaking, were overstaffed, journeymen no longer had a chance to become master craftsmen, and the earnings even of self-employed craftsmen were extraordinarily low. Above all, the crafts whose products competed with industry came under pressure from this side, which erupted in riots such as the Berlin tailors' revolution (1830).

=== Regional industrialization ===
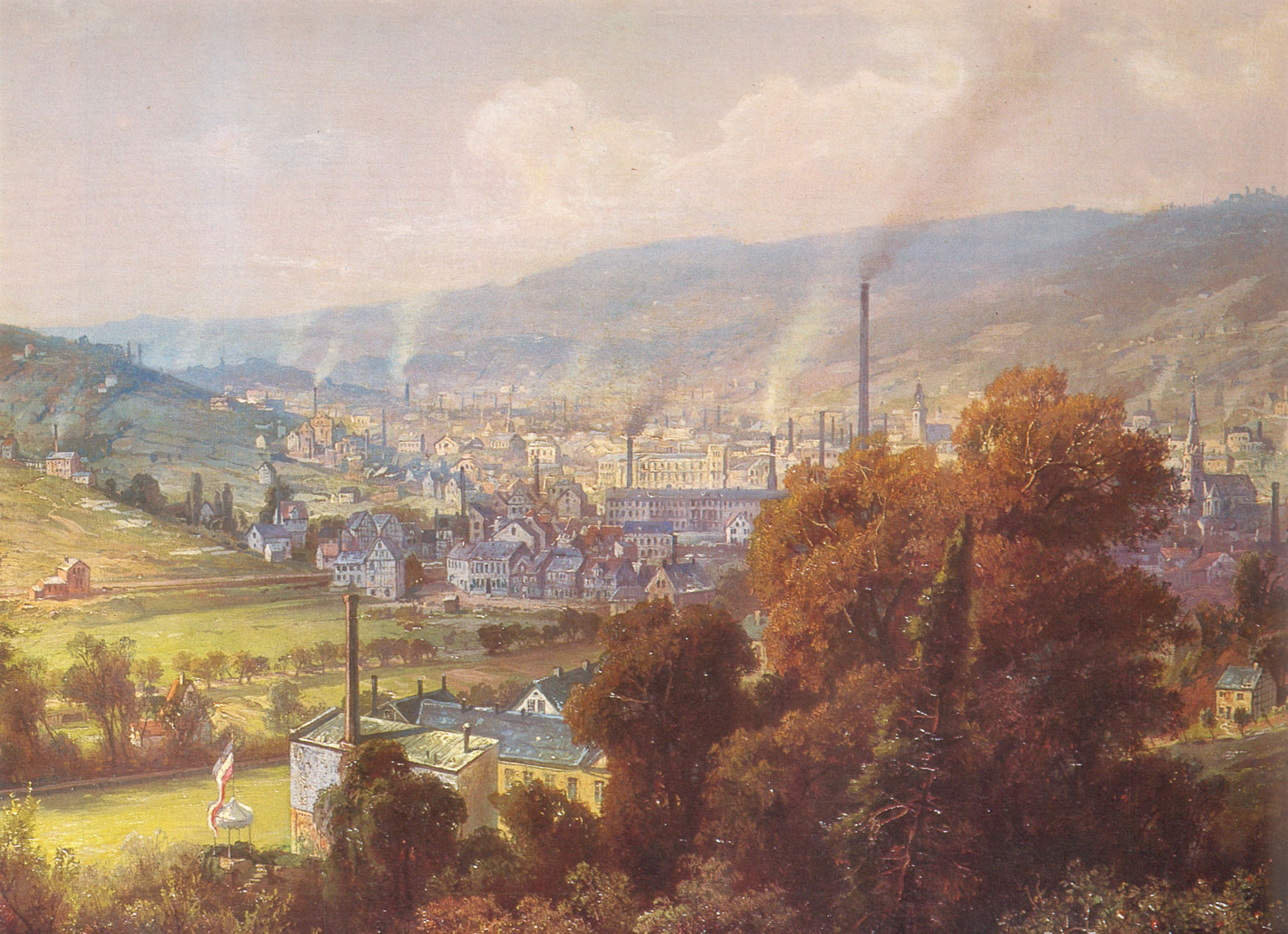
Barmen, industrialized at a very early stage together with neighboring Elberfeld (around 1870, painting by August von Wille)

One characteristic of industrial development was its uneven regional distribution. The reasons for this were manifold. Connection to the railroad network or the availability of raw materials, labor or capital played a role.

In the decades of industrialization, some old commercial concentration zones adapted to industrial development. In Bielefeld, for example, large textile factories took the place of home-based linen producers. In Wuppertal and Saxony, too, industry took up old traditions. Chemnitz was the core of Saxon industrialization here. Chemnitz developed into the leading industrial city in Germany. Machine tool building, textile machine building, the textile industry, bicycle building, motorcycle building, vehicle building, steam engine building, locomotive building and the chemical industry played a leading role. In Berlin, for example, the ready-made clothing industry, mechanical engineering, banks and insurance companies were the main industries to settle. The Rhineland benefited from its transport location. The Ruhr region, partly in the Rhine Province and partly in the province of Westphalia, developed into a center of industry, especially the coal and steel industry, due to its raw materials. Mining had already existed there in some places before, but the northward migration of mining brought about a completely new development in some areas. The proximity of the factories to the raw materials was less important, for example in mechanical engineering, which became established at numerous locations. Thus, locomotive factories often sprang up in the capital and residence cities.

Distribution of machine tool factories in 1846 in Germany:

- Chemnitz/Zwickau = approx. 135 factories
- Dresden = approx. 60 factories
- Berlin = approx. 38 factories
- Leipzig = approx. 19 factories
- Cologne = approx. 5 factories
- Düsseldorf = approx. 5 factories
- Middle Franconia = approx. 5 factories

However, there were also areas that benefited less from industrial development. For example, the once rich Silesia fell behind due to its relatively remote location in terms of transportation. Parts of the Sauerland and Siegerland regions, with their traditional iron production, found it difficult or impossible to hold their own against competition from the nearby Ruhr area. Conversely, the construction of the main line of the Cologne-Minden Railroad Company until 1847 and the parallel line of the Bergisch-Markisch Railway Company to the south in 1862 had a beneficial effect on the emerging Ruhr region.

At the end of the era, four types of regions can be distinguished. The first comprises clearly industrialized areas such as the Kingdom of Saxony (here primarily the region around Chemnitz), the Rhineland, Alsace-Lorraine, the Rhine Palatinate and also the Grand Duchy of Hesse. A second group includes those regions in which some sectors or subregions appear to be pioneers of industrialization, but the area as a whole cannot be considered industrialized. These include Württemberg, Baden, Silesia, Westphalia, and the Prussian provinces of Saxony and Hesse-Nassau. In a third group, there are regions in which there were early industrial beginnings in some cities, but which otherwise had comparatively little industrial development. These include the kingdom or province of Hanover, the areas of the Thuringian-Saxon principalities in the Thuringian Forest and southern Thuringia, as well as neighboring Upper and Middle Franconia. In addition, there are areas that were predominantly agricultural and whose trades were mostly artisanal. These include, for example, East and West Prussia, Posen and Mecklenburg.

=== Leading industries ===
The central growth engine for industrialization in Germany was railroad construction. The demand generated by the railroad boosted developments in the three closely interrelated key industries: mining, metal production and mechanical engineering.

==== Railroad construction ====
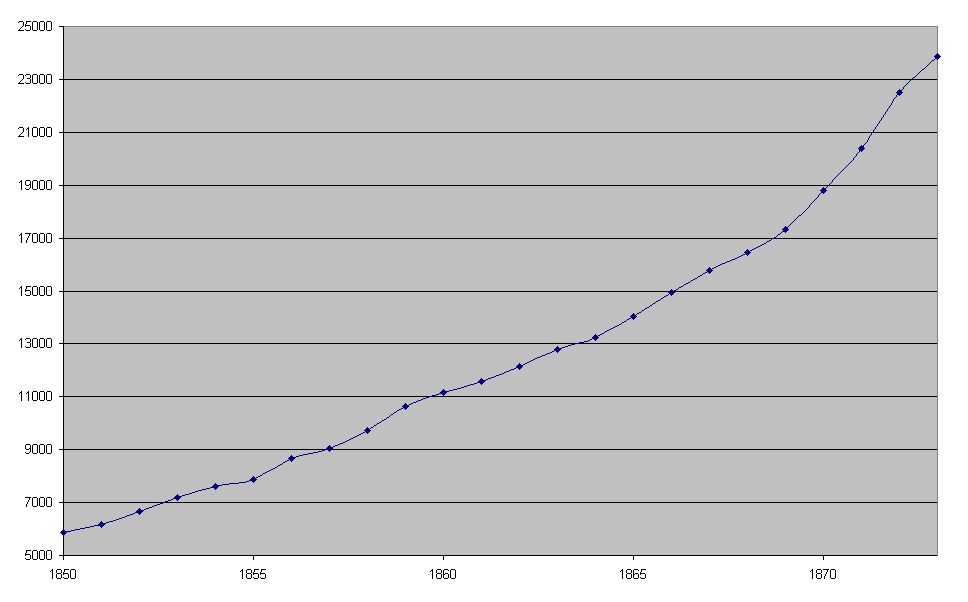
Route kilometers of railroads in the territory of the German Confederation 1850–1873

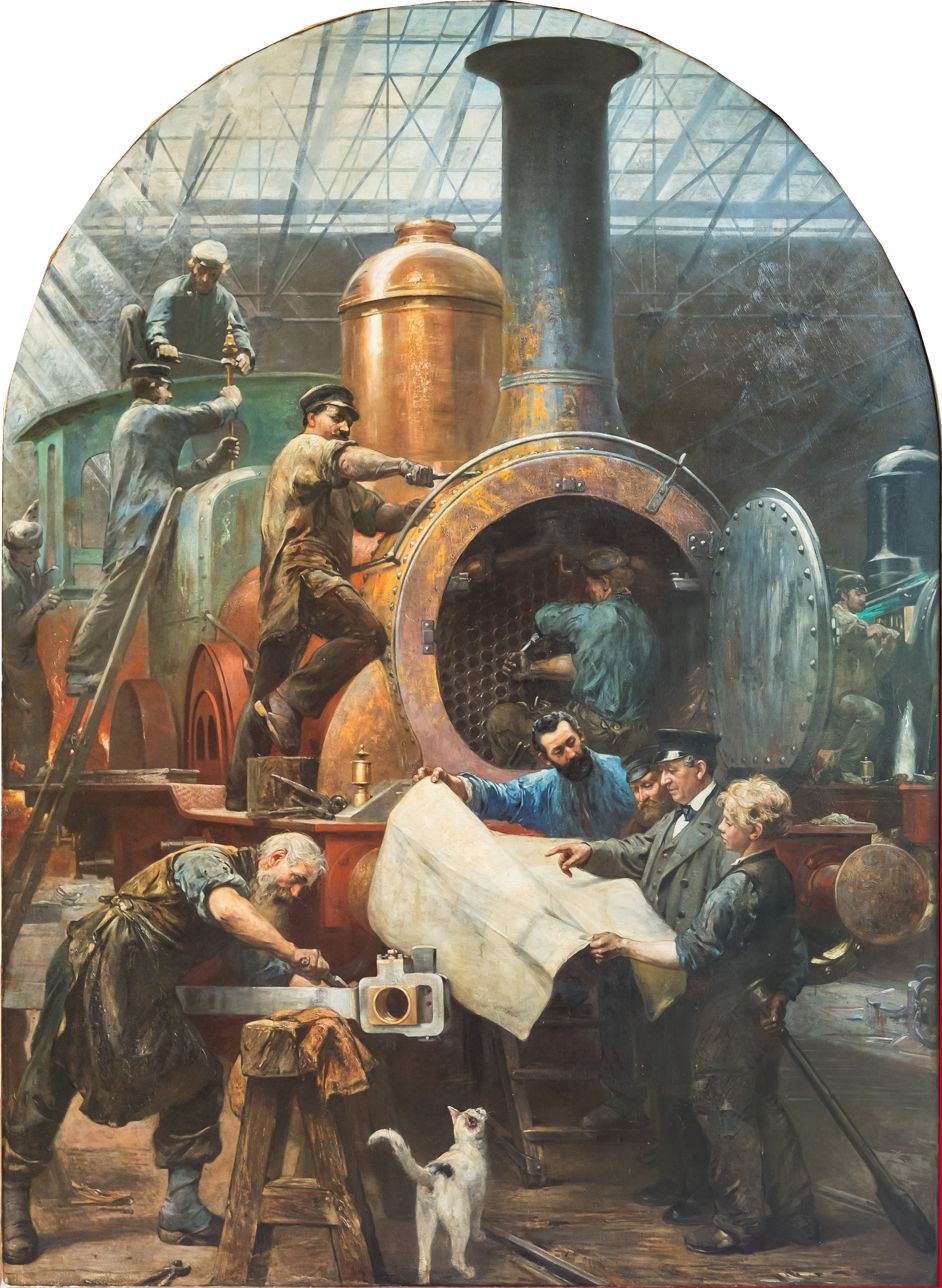
Locomotive construction in Germany

In the secondary sector, the railroad was the strongest growth engine and also held a key position overall. The railroad age began in Germany with the six-kilometer line between Nuremberg and Fürth built by the Ludwigseisenbahn-Gesellschaft in 1834/35. The first economically significant line was the 115-kilometer Leipzig-Dresden line built on the decisive initiative of Friedrich List (1837).

The growing demand for transportation led to the expansion of the rail network, which in turn increased the demand for iron and coal. The strength of this relationship is shown by the fact that between 1850 and 1890, about half of iron production was consumed by railroads. With the expansion of domestic iron production since the 1850s, railroad construction also gained new momentum. In the course of the expansion of the rail network, transport prices fell continuously, which in turn had a beneficial effect on the economy as a whole. The fact that between 1850 and 1890, about 25 percent of total investment went into railroads speaks for the importance of railroads for the economy as a whole. For a long time, investment in railroads was higher than in manufacturing or industry.

Railroad construction experienced its first peak in the 1840s. In 1840, there were about 580 kilometers of track; by 1850, there were already more than 7,000 kilometers, and by 1870, there were nearly 25,000 kilometers of track. Also, in 1840, more than 42,000 people were already employed in the construction of the railroads and in their operation, which was more than in coal mining. This number continued to grow over the next few years, reaching almost 180,000 workers in 1846. Only a small part of about 26,000 workers were permanently employed in operations; the rest were involved in the construction of the lines.

==== Metal processing ====
Around the turn of the century, the first steam-powered machines were built and used in Germany. In 1807, the brothers Franz and Johann Dinnendahl built the first steam engines in Essen. These were primarily used to pump out water in mines in the Ruhr region. Friedrich Harkort founded his mechanical workshop in Wetter in 1817. In 1836, there were nine mechanical engineering companies in the Aachen area with a combined workforce of a thousand. In 1832, there were 210 steam engines in all of Prussia. In the Kingdom of Hanover, the first one was started up in 1831.

With the advent of the railroad age in 1835, the demand for rails and locomotives grew. Since the 1830s, the number of manufacturers of steam engines and locomotives grew. At the top was undoubtedly the Borsig company, which produced its first locomotive in 1841 and its thousandth in 1858, becoming the third largest locomotive factory in the world with 1100 employees. Their rise, in turn, increased the need for products of the coal and steel industry.

In the field of metal processing, mechanical engineering had a leading function as the most modern and growth-intensive sector. In addition to a few large companies, there were numerous small and medium-sized enterprises in this sector, not infrequently family-owned. The main locations were Chemnitz and Zwickau, as well as Berlin, Dresden, Hanover, Leipzig, Mannheim and Cologne. Johann von Zimmermann founded Germany's first machine tool factory in Chemnitz in 1848. In addition, customers in the heavy and textile industries, for example, were attracted by factories of this type. Mechanical engineering in Germany benefited from the founding of various trade schools, some of which later became technical universities. While new products in mechanical engineering were still being developed in England on the basis of empirical experience, engineering calculations were already gaining ground in Germany. Whereas in the 1860s the main products were steam engines, by 1871 the focus of production was more or less evenly divided between textile machinery, steam engines and agricultural machinery. In 1846, there were only 1518 steam engines in the territory of the Zollverein; by 1861, there were 8695. In Prussia alone, there were 25,000 plants in 1873.

==== Mining ====
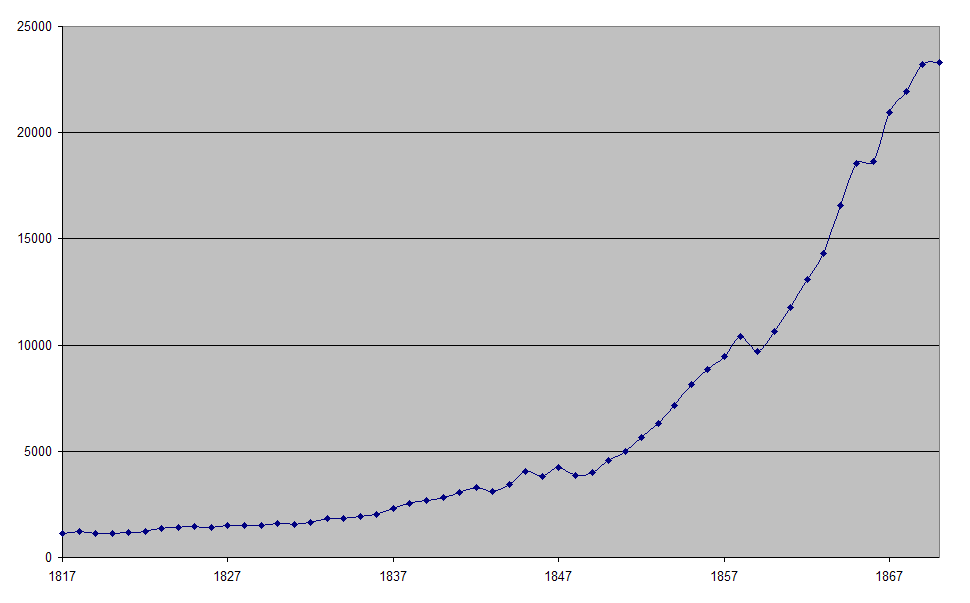
Hard coal production in Prussia 1817–1870 (in 1000 t)

Until the 19th century, the mining of ores or coal was subject to the princely Bergregal. In the Saar region, the Prussian state took over state ownership of the coal mines, with one exception. In the Prussian western territories, the so-called directorate principle was introduced in 1766. Making the Ruhr navigable in the final phase of Frederick II's reign made it much easier to export coal. After the establishment of the provinces of Rhineland and Westphalia, the Oberbergamtsbezirk Dortmund was created in 1815. This extended from Emmerich in the west to Minden in the east, from Ibbenbüren in the north to Lüdenscheid in the south. The mining authority regulated mining, working conditions and payment of the "miners." This meant considerable protection for the employees, but also restricted entrepreneurial decisions. Although production increased considerably from 177,000 to 513,000 tons between 1790 and 1815, the economic significance still remained quite modest. In 1815, for example, only 3,400 miners were employed. One example of the possibility of being successful in mining despite the supervision of the authorities was Mathias Stinnes from the port city of Mülheim. Starting in 1818, he systematically built up a coal transport company with customers in the Rhineland and Holland. Stinnes soon had numerous barges at his disposal and was one of the first to use steam-powered tugboats. He used the profits to buy shares in mining companies. In the year of his death, he was the most important mining entrepreneur in the district, with four collieries of his own and shares in 36 other mines.

The use of steam engines for dewatering made it possible to mine at greater depths. The decisive factor, however, was the possibility of breaking through the marl layer with the so-called deep mines. Franz Haniel (co-owner of Gutehoffnungshütte) was one of the first entrepreneurs to have such mines built near Essen, starting in 1830. In the following years, the number of deep mines increased to 48 with 95 steam engines (1845). By 1840, the output in the Oberbergamtsbezirk had risen to 1.2 million tons and the workforce to almost 9,000 men. Coal production was also increased in other mining districts in the first decades of the 19th century. These included the Aachen coalfield in the Düren mining district. In 1836, there were 36 coal mines in this region.

From the 1840s onward, the demand for iron products triggered by railroad construction had a particularly positive effect on mining. In addition, there were changes in the legal framework. These included, in particular, the gradual abandonment of official control of mining from 1851 onward. This development was not completed until the Prussian mining law reform of 1861, which was one of the reasons for the upswing in private-sector mining in the Ruhr and Silesia.

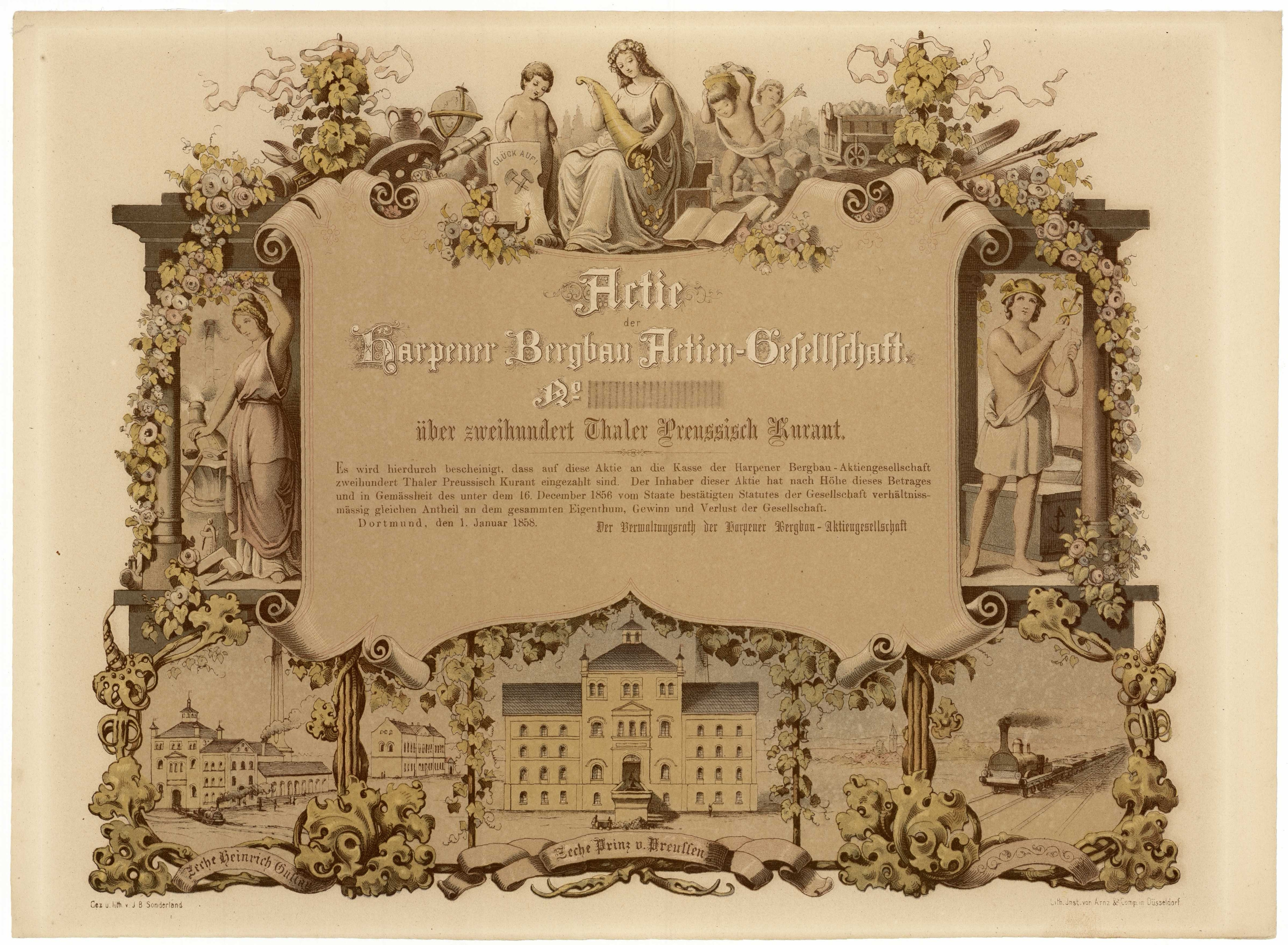
Share of the Harpener Bergbau AG, issued January 1, 1858

The changes in mining law also facilitated the establishment of the modern stock corporation as a form of enterprise in mining. The Irishman William Thomas Mulvany created Hibernia AG in 1854, and in 1856 various shareholders founded Harpener Bergbau AG. Both rose to become leading mining companies in the mining district in the following decades. In the 1850s, numerous new collieries were established in the Ruhr region. In 1860, their number peaked at 277 companies. This was accompanied by a considerable increase in production volumes. In the years that followed, the number of collieries declined, while production capacities were further increased by the merger of smaller collieries into larger units. The most successful at the end of the Industrial Revolution was Friedrich Grillo in 1873 with his Gelsenkirchener Bergwerks AG.

==== Iron and steel production ====
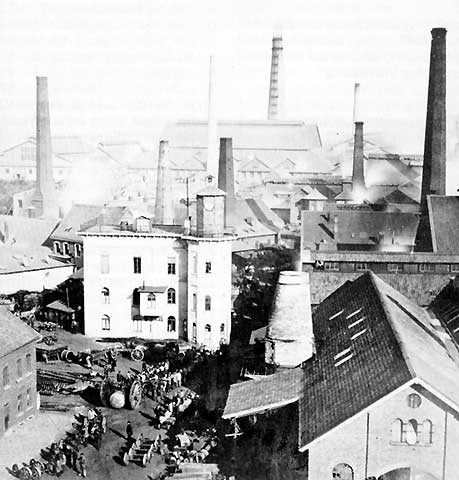
Krupp plant in Essen around 1864

The beginnings of a number of later leading heavy industrial companies also fall into the period of early industrialization. On the Saar, Carl Ferdinand von Stumm-Halberg and his family played the leading role in heavy industry, especially when they controlled their competitor Dillinger Hütte from 1827. In Sterkrade near Oberhausen, various companies founded the Gutehoffnungshütte in 1810. While the company had only 340 workers around 1830, by the early 1840s it already employed around 2,000. Friedrich Krupp had started cast steel production in Essen in 1811, but left his son Alfred a highly indebted company in 1826. The company's situation remained problematic until railroad construction boosted demand in the 1840s.

An important technical innovation in the first decades of the 19th century was the construction of puddling mills, which, using hard coal, were much more productive and cost-effective than the old charcoal-based smelters. In 1824, the process was introduced at a smelter in Neuwied, followed by Eberhard Hoesch's Lendersdorf smelter near Düren in 1825, and Harkort's plant a year later. The conversions and new establishments that took place in the following two decades led – as in the case of the Hüstener Gewerkschaft – to further operating departments such as rolling mills, wire drawing mills and mechanical engineering departments. The expansion of the railroad caused the demand for iron and rails and other mining industry products to implode within a short period of time.

Within metal production, technical innovations ensured a considerable advance in production, such as the aforementioned production of iron using coking coal instead of the expensive charcoal previously used. While only 25% of iron was produced with coke in 1850, this figure had risen to 63% just three years later. In the 1860s, the Bessemer process became established in steel production. This made it possible to produce steel from liquid pig iron on an industrial scale.

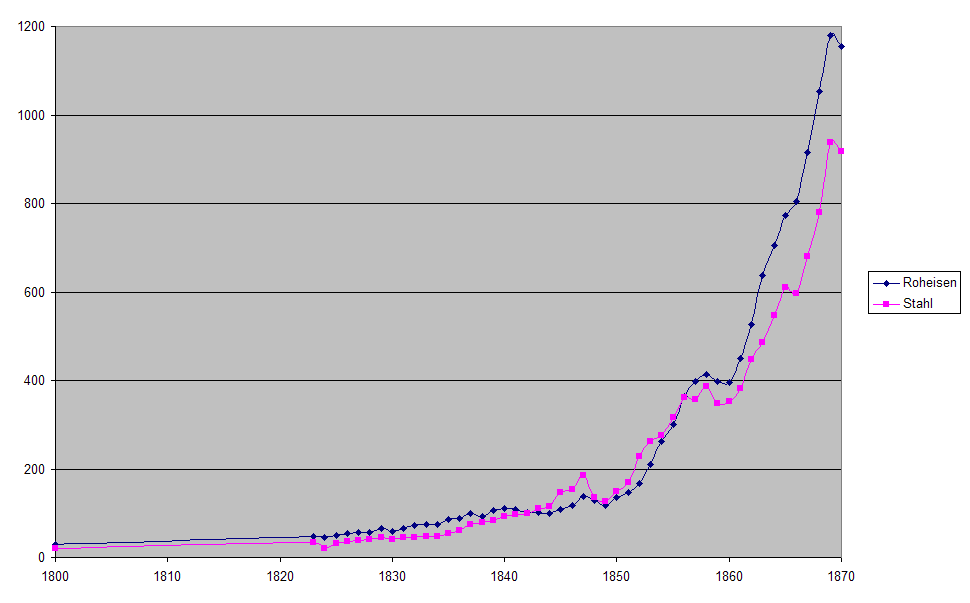
Iron and steel production in Prussia 1800–1870 (in 1000 t)

In total, around 1850, at the beginning of the actual Industrial Revolution in the territory of the German Confederation, only 13,500 workers were employed in pig iron production and their production volume was around 214,000 tons. In the following ten years, production grew by 150%, in the 1860s by another 160%, and at the height of the Industrial Revolution from 1870 to 1873 by 350%. During this period, the number of workers had grown by only 100%. The reasons lay in the technical improvement of production, but also in the emergence of an experienced skilled workforce. Steel production, which was technically more complex, expanded even more and had almost caught up with iron production by 1850. At that time, about 200,000 tons were produced with about 20,000 workers. In 1873, production was 1.6 million tons with 79,000 employees.

=== Corporate formation ===
While the heavy industrial companies were often still small businesses at the beginning of the Industrial Revolution, some of them grew into giant enterprises in the course of this period. In 1835, 67 people worked for Krupp; by 1871, the workforce had grown to 9,000, and by 1873 to almost 13,000. At the same time, stock corporations – with exceptions such as Krupp or a few Upper Silesian family businesses – became the dominant form of enterprise.

In addition, vertically and horizontally linked corporations were already emerging in this phase, especially in heavy industry. For example, mines, iron production and steel production, rolling mills and engineering companies were combined. The Gutehoffnungshütte in Oberhausen, the Bochumer Verein, the Hoesch and Thyssen companies, the Hoerder Verein and also family-owned companies such as the Henckel von Donnersmarck in Upper Silesia developed in this direction. While most of the companies developed in this direction only gradually, the Dortmunder Union was founded immediately in 1872 as a diversified association of companies. The same applied to Gelsenkirchener Bergwerks AG (1873). Both projects were largely driven by Friedrich Grillo and financed by the Disconto-Gesellschaft headed by Adolph von Hansemann.

=== Industrial finance and banking ===
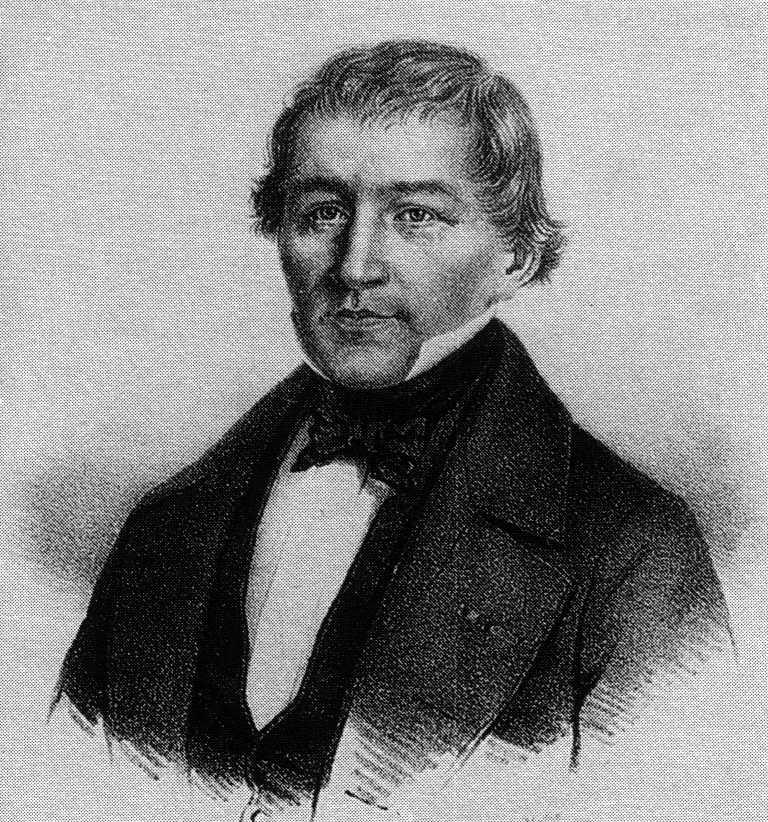
David Hansemann

Not infrequently, the financing of the first industrial enterprises was based on equity capital or family money. In the long term, the establishment and further development of companies relied on banks to provide the necessary capital. In the first decades, these were predominantly private bankers. In addition, the development of joint-stock banks and the system of universal banks typical of later developments in Germany began before 1870. Private banks initially played a central role, particularly in financing the profitable construction of railroads. They were issuing agents for the corresponding shares, and the heads of the banks often sat on the management committees or supervisory boards of the railroad companies. The role of the private banks in the Rheinische Eisenbahngesellschaft is particularly well documented. Initially, the leading force was Ludolf Camphausen. They were joined from the Cologne banking community by A. Schaaffhausen, Abraham Oppenheim and a group from Aachen around David Hansemann. Later, Oppenheim became the main shareholder. The railroad business was also important as a bridge to investment in mining and heavy industry. However, the financing of railroads was also very risky. For this reason, plans for the establishment of joint-stock banks emerged in the circles of West German private bankers as early as the 1840s, but these failed due to the Prussian state bureaucracy. In response to the acute crisis of Schaaffhausen's bank, A. Schaaffhausen'scher Bankverein was founded in 1848 as the first joint stock bank. This was followed in 1853 by the Bank für Handel und Industrie, also known as Darmstädter Bank, in which Gustav Mevissen, among others, took a stake, in 1856 by David Hansemann's Disconto-Gesellschaft, which was converted into a stock corporation, and in the same year by Berliner Handels-Gesellschaft. These joint-stock companies focused on financing industrial and other ventures with high capital requirements. As a result, unlike in Great Britain, for example, there was a division of labor. The issuance of banknotes remained in the hands of (semi-)state institutions. The Bank of Prussia soon played a central role. In contrast, private and joint-stock banks concentrated on the founding and issuing activities of industrial joint-stock companies.

== Economic Fluctuations ==
In relation to the economy as a whole during this period, growth rates were not above average. The average increase in net national product per year was 2.36% between 1850 and 1857, rising to about 3.31% in the period from 1863 to 1871. A different picture emerges when the various sectors of the economy are examined separately. By far the greatest growth was in the industrial sector. This development was what was actually new. Within industry, consumer goods production initially dominated, especially the textile industry. Economic development in the industrial sector was thus still strongly dependent on the development of real wages. This changed significantly after 1840, when railroads and heavy industry rose to become leading industrial sectors. Industrial cyclical development now primarily followed its own profit expectations.

However, the secondary sector was not yet strong enough to dominate overall economic development. It was not until the end of the Industrial Revolution around 1870 that it clearly took over the leading role. Until then, the development of agriculture, i.e. the main component of the primary sector, still had its own momentum. This is also one of the reasons why macroeconomic Business cycles in the modern sense did not appear until the beginning of the Empire. Until then, older agricultural upswings and downswings mixed with industrial influences in the "economic alternations."

The older-type agrarian economic crises were primarily related to crop failures, i.e., natural influences. Good harvests made food cheaper, but a high drop in prices led to a loss of income for farmers, which in turn had a considerable impact on demand for industrial products. Conversely, poor harvests led to extreme increases in food prices. Agricultural crises of this kind occurred in 1805/06, 1816/17 (Year Without a Summer), 1829/30, and the worst was that of 1846/47 (Potato Revolution).

The industrial type of business cycle can first be traced in Germany in the mid-1840s. The years 1841 to 1845 saw a veritable investment boom in railroads, which attracted capital at hitherto unknown levels within a very short period of time, but then quickly broke off again.

The waning of this upswing was related to and further intensified by the agricultural crisis of 1847. Food prices and the hunger crisis were joined by unemployment and loss of earnings. This further reinforced the pre-revolutionary trend, even among the lower classes. The economic trough did not end until late 1849 or early 1850.

According to historians, a fundamental turnaround was indicated by the fact that crop failures in the early 1850s had only a regional impact, since rail transport in particular ensured an intra-European balance. This period saw investment in all commercial sectors, especially railroads. The rise of industry was interrupted from 1857 to 1859 by the Panic of 1857, often referred to as the "first world economic crisis" (Hans Rosenberg). At its core, this was a trade, speculation and banking crisis, originating primarily in Hamburg. The crisis came about when the trade and arms deals financed with bank bills between Hamburg, America, England and Scandinavia burst. The origin of this was in the United States, where the collapse of one bank triggered a kind of chain reaction and the collapse of numerous other credit institutions. However, there were also factors in the industrial sector. In many places, for example, production capacities failed to keep pace with demand. However, the crisis was much shorter and the effects less severe than the founders' crisis after 1873.

Compared with the first half of the 1850s, the economy remained comparatively weak in the first half of the 1860s. This was mainly due to external influences such as the American Civil War. Due to the lack of cotton supplies from the Southern states, the textile industry suffered most. In other respects, companies were reluctant to invest after the experiences of 1857–1859. After the mid-1860s, there was another considerable economic upswing, which turned into the "founders' boom". This was no longer driven solely by heavy industry; the textile industry and agriculture grew almost as significantly. Slowed only briefly by the War of 1870/71, growth continued until the start of the Gründerkrise in 1873. While the economic ups and downs in the middle of the century were also determined by agriculture, industry now clearly dominated.

GNP (PPP) per capita in 1960 US dollars of different countries in Europe according to Paul Bairoch (1830–1938)
Country / Region	1830	1840	1850	1860	1870	1880	1890	1900	1910	1913	1925	1938
Austria-Hungary	250	266	283	288	305	315	361	414	469	498	–	–
Belgium	295	345	411	490	571	589	630	721	854	894	985	1015
France	264	302	333	365	437	464	515	604	680	689	893	936
Germany	245	267	308	354	426	443	537	639	705	743	712	1126
Italy	265	270	277	301	312	311	311	335	366	441	480	551
Netherlands	347	382	427	452	506	542	586	614	705	754	909	920
Russia/USSR	170	170	175	178	250	224	182	248	287	326	232	458
Spain	263	288	313	346	329	323	321	351	370	367	426	337
Sweden	194	198	211	225	246	303	356	454	593	680	765	1097
Switzerland	276	315	391	480	549	676	705	785	895	964	1020	1204
United Kingdom	346	394	458	558	628	680	785	881	904	965	970	1181

== Social change ==
During the decades of the Industrial Revolution, not only the economy but also society underwent major changes. Just as older forms of trade and commerce came to stand side by side with modern industry in the economic sphere, older and newer ways of life, social groups and social problems also mingled.

=== Bourgeoisie ===
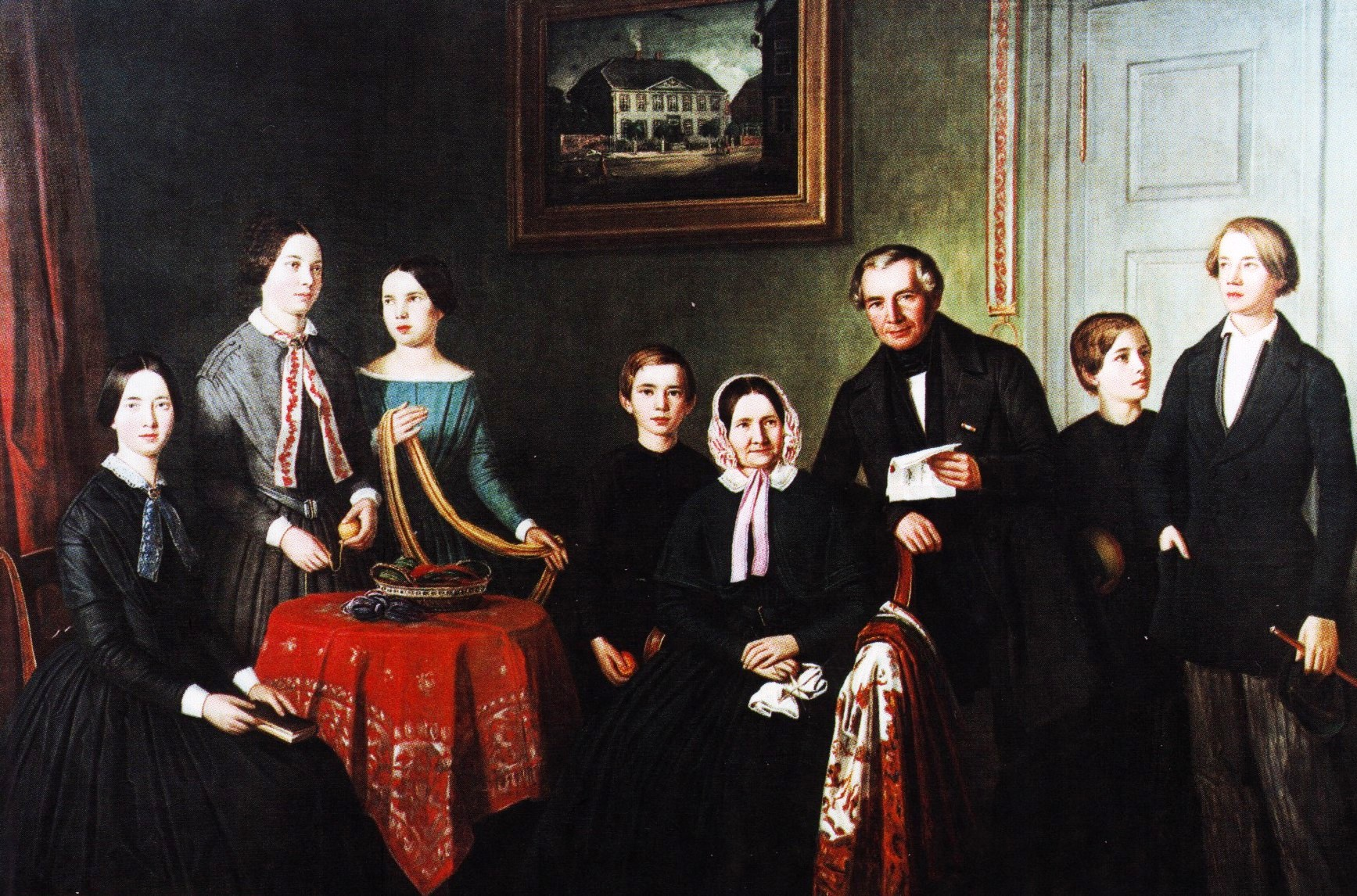
Oil painting of the family of the entrepreneur Brökelmann by Engelbert Seibertz from 1850

The 19th century is considered the time of the breakthrough of bourgeois society. However, the bourgeoisie never constituted the majority of society in quantitative terms. In the beginning, rural society predominated, and in the end, the industrial workforce was about to overtake the bourgeois in terms of numbers. The bourgeois way of life, its values and its norms became formative for the 19th century. Although monarchs and nobility initially still maintained their leading role in politics, this was shaped and challenged solely by the new national and bourgeois movements.

However, the bourgeoisie was not a homogeneous group, but consisted of different parts. In continuity with the bourgeoisie of the early modern period was the old town bourgeoisie of craftsmen, innkeepers or merchants. Downward this gradually passed into the petty bourgeoisie of small tradesmen, individual masters or merchants. The number of full citizens ranged from 15 to 30% of the inhabitants until the 19th century. They lost the exclusivity of the citizen status after the reforms in the Rhine Confederation states, in Prussia and later also in the other German states due to the civic equality concept and its gradual enforcement. With a few exceptions, the group of old urban citizens remained in the traditional ways of life in the early 19th century. In the bourgeoisie, class tradition, family rank, familiar forms of business, and class-specific consumption of expenditure counted. In contrast, this group was skeptical of the rapid but risky industrial development. Numerically, this group formed the largest group of citizens until well into the middle of the 19th century.

Beyond the old bourgeoisie, new groups of citizens had been rising since the 18th century. These included above all the educated and business bourgeoisie. The core of the Bildungsbürgertum in the territory of the German Confederation was formed primarily by the higher employees in the civil service, in the judiciary and in the higher education system of grammar schools and universities, which expanded in the 19th century. In addition to the civil servants, independent academic professions such as doctors, lawyers, notaries and architects began to gain in number only in the 1830s and 40s. For this group, membership was not based on class privileges but on performance qualifications.

Although self-recruitment was high, the educated middle classes in the first half of the 19th century were quite receptive to social climbers. About 15–20% came from rather petty-bourgeois backgrounds and managed to advance via the baccalaureate and university studies. The different origins were equalized by education and similar social circles.

The educated bourgeoisie, which constituted a considerable part of the bureaucratic and legal functional elite, was certainly the most influential bourgeois subgroup politically. At the same time, however, it also set cultural norms that were more or less adapted by other bourgeois groups, including the working class and even the nobility. These include, for example, the bourgeois family image of the publicly active man and the wife caring for the home and children, which dominated into the 20th century. The educated middle class was based on a neo-humanist ideal of education. This served both to distinguish it from the privileged aristocracy and from the uneducated classes.

With industrial development, a new economic bourgeoisie increasingly joined the urban and educated bourgeoisie. The German form of the bourgeoisie originated from the group of entrepreneurs. Research estimates that by the middle of the 19th century, this group included several hundred entrepreneurial families. By 1873, their number had increased to several thousand families, but the economic bourgeoisie was numerically the smallest bourgeois subgroup. In addition to industrialists, they included bankers, capital owners and, increasingly, salaried managers.

The social origins of the economic bourgeoisie varied. Some of them, such as August Borsig, were social climbers from artisan circles, while a considerable number, such as the Krupps, came from respected, long-established and prosperous middle-class merchant families. It is estimated that about 54% of the industrialists came from entrepreneurial families, 26% came from families of farmers, self-employed craftsmen or small merchants, and the remaining 20% came from the educated middle classes, from families of officers and large landowners. Virtually no industrialists came from working-class families or the rural lower class. Already during the Industrial Revolution, the type of social climber lost weight. Whereas in 1851 only 1.4% of entrepreneurs were academically educated, by 1870 37% of all entrepreneurs had attended university. From the 1850s onward, the economic bourgeoisie began to set itself apart from the other bourgeois groups through its lifestyle – for example, by building prestigious villas or buying land. In some cases, they began to model their lifestyles on the aristocracy. However, only the owners of large estates had the means to do so.

=== Pauperism ===
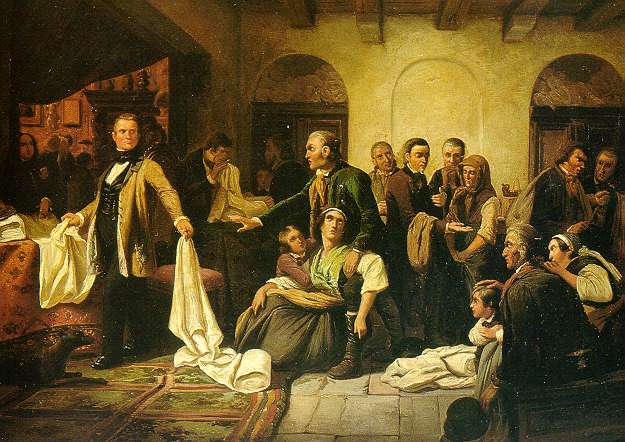
The Silesian Weavers (painting by Karl Hübner, 1846)

The growth of the new industry was impressive in some areas; however, for a long time this impetus was not enough to keep the growing population reasonably employed and fed. In addition, the collapse of old trades and the crisis in the crafts sector exacerbated social hardship. The manufacturing trades, which were often overstaffed, were particularly affected. In the medium term, however, the craftsmen succeeded in adapting to industrial capitalist conditions. For example, the building trade benefited from the growth of the cities, and other crafts increasingly focused on repair rather than production.

In rural society, the number of farms had increased sharply since the 18th century in sub- or small-scale farming classes with little or no arable land. Commercial means of earning a living – whether in rural crafts or in cottage industries – had contributed greatly to this. With the crisis of the crafts and the decline of the cottage industry, significant portions of these groups fell into poverty. These developments contributed not insignificantly to the pauperism of the Vormärz. In the medium term, large sections of factory workers came from these groups, but for a longer transitional period, industrialization meant the impoverishment of large numbers of people. Initially, living standards declined along with the opportunities for profit, before a large proportion of, for example, cottage industry workers became unemployed. The best known in this context are the Silesian weavers.

=== Emigration ===
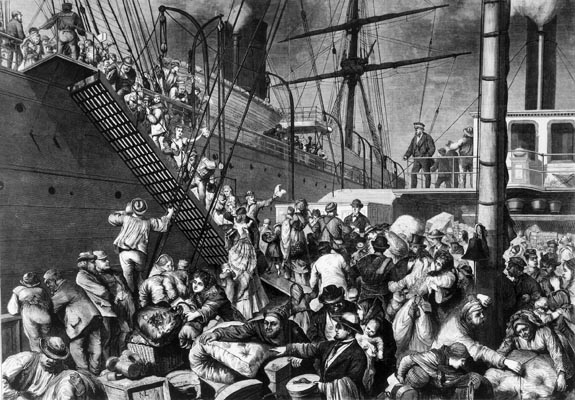
German emigrants in the port of Hamburg (around 1850)

Since most of the new industries initially provided work for the local lower classes, internal migration still played a minor role in the first decades. Instead, emigration seemed to be a way to overcome social hardship. In the first decades of the 19th century, the quantitative scope of this type of migration was still limited. Between 1820 and 1830, the number of emigrants fluctuated between 3000 and 5000 people per year. Since the 1830s, the numbers began to increase significantly. Here, the main phase of pauperism and the agrarian crisis of 1846/47 had an impact. The movement therefore reached a first peak in 1847 with 80,000 emigrants.

Emigration itself took on organized forms, first through emigration associations and increasingly through commercially oriented agents, who not infrequently worked with disreputable methods and defrauded their clientele. In some cases, especially in southwestern Germany and particularly in Baden, emigration was encouraged by governments as a means of alleviating the social crisis.

In the early 1850s, the number of emigrants continued to rise, reaching 239,000 people per year in 1854. Social, economic, and even latent political motives were mixed in the process. A total of about 1.1 million people emigrated between 1850 and 1860, a quarter of whom came from regions in southwestern Germany alone.

=== Emergence of workforce and labour movements ===
From about the mid-1840s onward, the composition and character of the lower social strata began to change. One indicator of this is that from around this time the term proletariat played an increasingly important role in contemporary social discourse, displacing the concept of pauperism by the 1860s. Contemporary definitions show how differentiated this group was in the transition from traditional to industrial society. They included manual laborers and day laborers, journeymen craftsmen and assistants, and finally factory and industrial wage laborers. These "working classes" in the broadest sense constituted about 82% of all employed persons in Prussia in 1849, and together with their dependents they accounted for 67% of the total population.

Among these, modern factory workers initially still formed a small minority. In purely quantitative terms, there were 270,000 factory workers in Prussia in 1849 (including those employed in the manufactories). Including the 54,000 miners, the total number of workers was still quite small at 326,000. This number rose to 541,000 by 1861. Industrial workers were still a strategically important but numerically rather small group of the working classes. At the end of the Industrial Revolution in the early 1870s, statisticians counted 885,000 industrial workers and 396,000 miners in Prussia. On a slightly different data basis, the new Imperial Statistical Office counted 32% of the labor force as belonging to the mining, industrial, metallurgical and construction sectors by 1871. The number of manual workers and servants outside industry and agriculture was still high at 15.5%. In terms of industrial-mining employment, highly developed Saxony was clearly in the lead with 49% of the workforce.

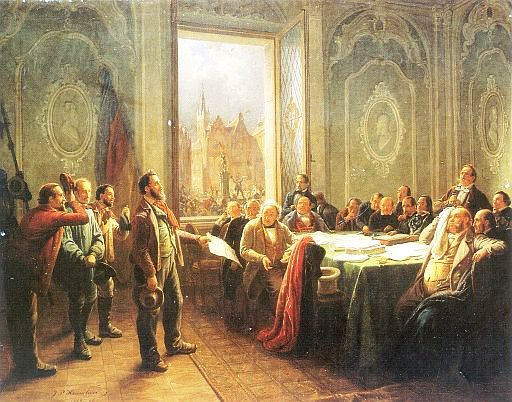
Workers in front of the magistrate during the 1848 revolution (painting by Johann Peter Hasenclever)

It was not only rural day laborers and urban industrial workers who differed in their earning potential, but there were also clear differentiations within these groups. The organization of work in large-scale factories, for example, led to a pronounced factory hierarchy consisting of skilled, semi-skilled and unskilled workers. The core of skilled workers consisted primarily of journeymen and master craftsmen from the crisis-ridden skilled trades. Specialized occupational groups such as printers or typesetters were once again clearly set apart. These often had a considerable amount of education, organized themselves at an early stage and felt themselves to be the vanguard of the qualified workforce. It was no coincidence that Stephen Born, the founder and many followers of the General German Workers' Brotherhood, came from this environment. The unskilled and semi-skilled workers mostly came from the urban lower classes or from the surrounding rural areas. In the decades of the Industrial Revolution, i.e., since the 1850s, the growing industry now also began to attract more internal migrants.

Women's work was and remained widespread in some industries, such as textiles, but women were hardly employed in mining or heavy industry. Particularly in the early decades, child labor also existed in the textile industry. However, the extent was much smaller than in the first decades of industrialization in England. Moreover, it remained a temporary phenomenon. Child and female labor, however, remained a widespread phenomenon in agriculture and cottage industries.

The merging of the initially very heterogeneous groups into a labor force with a more or less common self-image initially took place in the cities and was not least a result of the immigration of rural lower classes. Members of the pauperized classes of the Vormärz hoped to find more permanent and better-paid earnings in the cities. In the course of time, the initially very heterogeneous stratum of the "working classes" grew together; a permanent social milieu developed, fostered by the close living together in the narrow workers' quarters.

Within the "working classes," a profound change in mentality took place. Whereas the urban and rural lower classes had largely regarded their hardship as unchangeable, the new opportunities for earning money in industry led to a strengthening of the will to change. Those affected saw their situation as unjust and pressed for change. This was one of the social foundations for the emerging labor movement. The social grievances spreading to growing groups of dependent workers were discussed as the Social Question, for which social reformers and early socialists developed different solutions.

Historian Thomas Nipperdey remarks:

On the whole, industrialisation in Germany must be considered to have been positive in its effects. Not only did it change society and the countryside, and finally the world...it created the modern world we live in. It solved the problems of population growth, under-employment and pauperism in a stagnating economy, and abolished dependency on the natural conditions of agriculture, and finally hunger. It created huge improvements in production and both short- and long-term improvements in living standards. However, in terms of social inequality, it can be assumed that it did not change the relative levels of income. Between 1815 and 1873 the statistical distribution of wealth was on the order of 77% to 23% for entrepreneurs and workers respectively. On the other hand, new problems arose, in the form of interrupted growth and new crises, such as urbanisation, "alienation", new underclasses, proletariat and proletarian misery, new injustices and new masters and, eventually, class warfare.

== See also ==
- History of Germany
- Economic history of Germany
- Economy of Germany
