= Michelfeld Abbey =

Monastery in Auerbach, Germany

Coordinates: 49°42′14″N 11°35′14″E

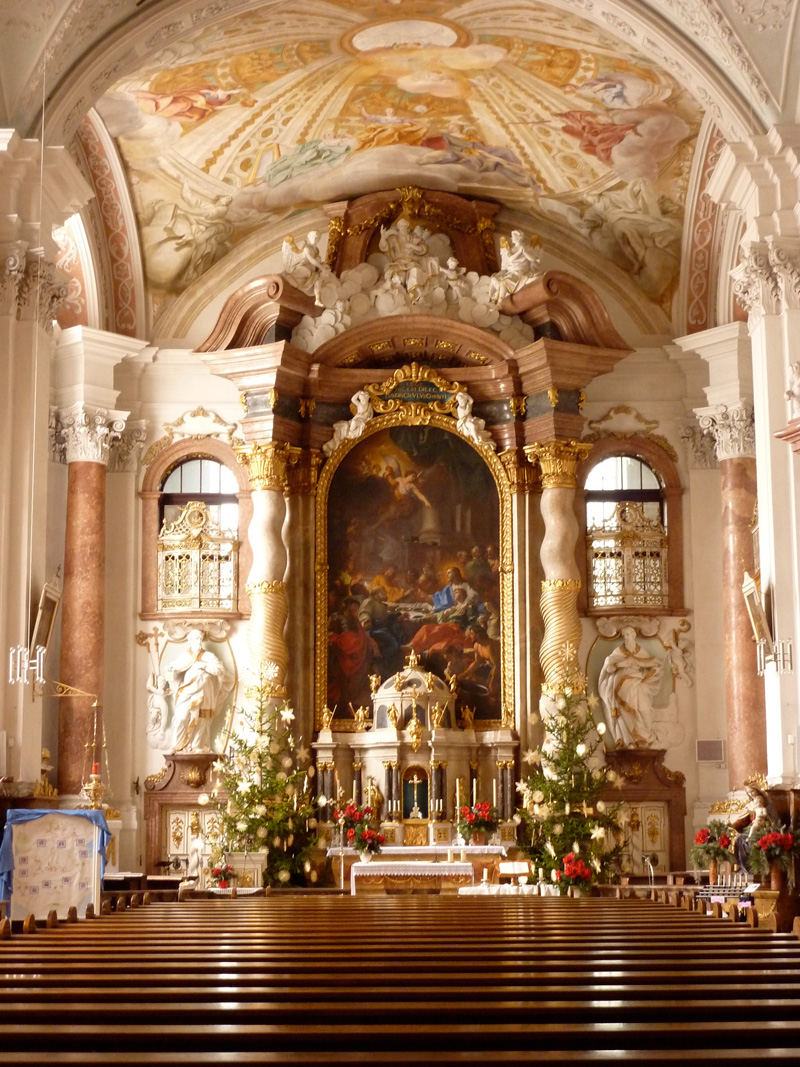
Interior of the former abbey church

Michelfeld Abbey (German: Kloster Michelfeld) was a Benedictine monastery in Auerbach in der Oberpfalz in Bavaria, Germany.

== History ==
The monastery, dedicated to Saint Michael and Saint John the Evangelist, was founded in 1119 by Bishop Otto I of Bamberg. It was dissolved in the Reformation, in 1556. Re-opened temporarily in 1661 and permanently in 1684, it was put under the administration of the Electors of Bavaria on 13 March 1802 and finally dissolved in 1803 in the secularisation of Bavaria.

== Buildings ==
The abbey church, refurbished throughout in the Baroque style in the early 18th century by the Asam brothers, became the parish church. Other former monastic buildings now accommodate a care home of the Regens-Wagner-Stiftungen run by the Franciscan Sisters of Dillingen.
