= Maurus von Schenkl =

German Benedictine theologian and canonist

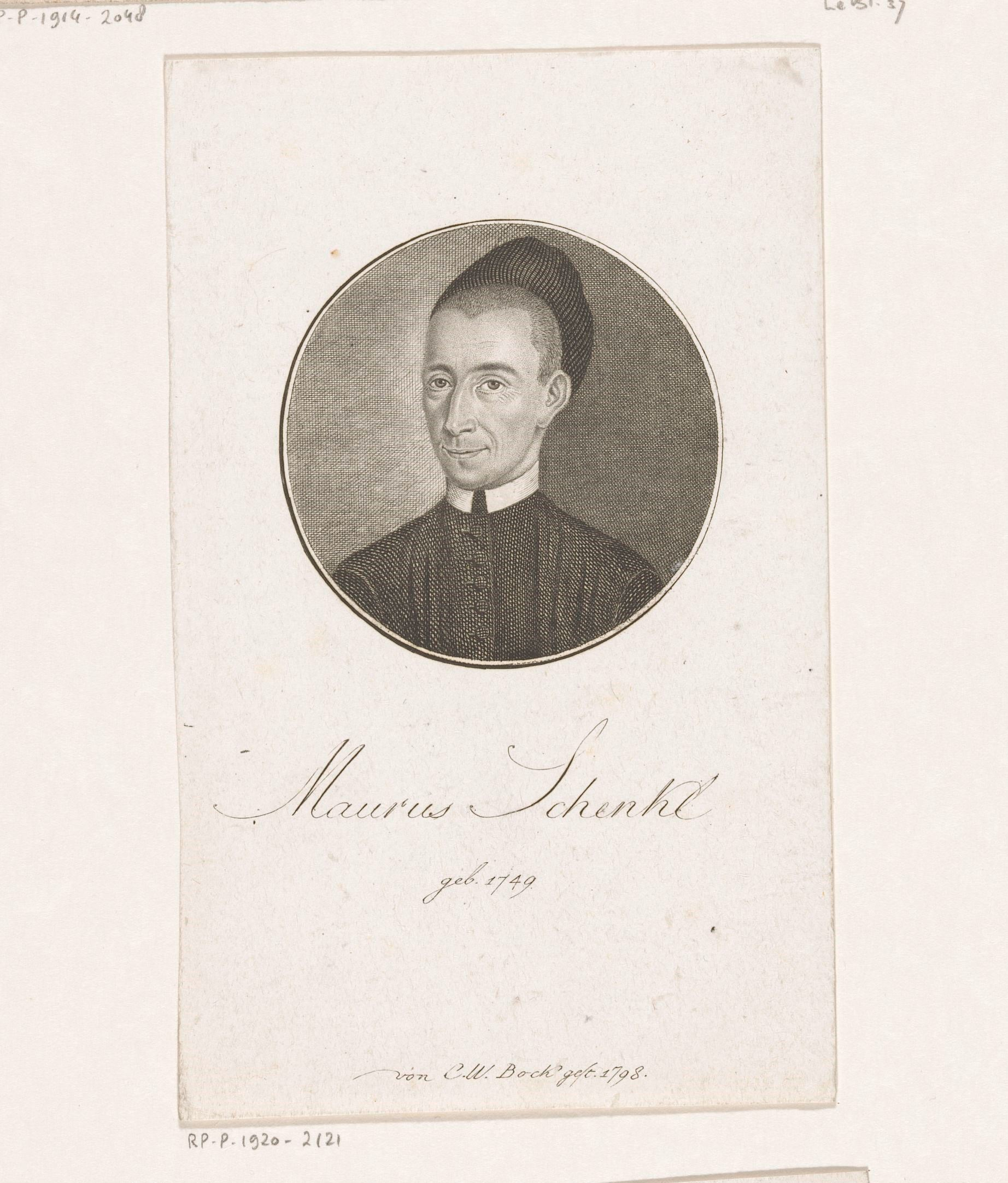
Maurus von Schenkl

Maurus von Schenkl (Auerbach in der Oberpfalz, Bavaria, 4 January 1749 - Amberg, Bavaria, 14 June 1816) was a German Benedictine theologian and canonist.

== Life ==
After studying the humanities at the Jesuit college in Amberg (1760–1765), he entered the Benedictine monastery of Prüfening (Priefling) near Regensburg. He took vows on 2 October 1768, and was ordained priest on 27 September 1772.

From 1772-7 he held various offices at his monastery; in 1777 he was at first oeconomus at Puch, then pastor at Gelgenbach; from 1778-83 he taught dogmatic, moral and pastoral theology and canon law at the Benedictine monastery of Weltenburg. In 1783 he became librarian at Prüfening where he at the same time taught canon law till 1785, then moral theology till 1790, when with his abbot's consent he accepted a position as professor of canon law, moral, and pastoral theology at the lyceum of Amberg.

With his professorial duties was connected the regency of the seminary and, after declining an offer to succeed his confrère, Beda Aschenbrenner, as professor of canon law at the University of Ingolstadt in 1793; he was also appointed rector of the school at Amberg in 1794. Upon his request he was relieved of the rectorship in 1798 and, after refusing another offer as professor of canon law at Aschaffenburg in 1804; he was honored with the title of spiritual councillor of the king. Owing to ill-health he resigned the regency of the seminary and after 1808 he taught only canon law and pastoral theology.

== Works ==
He was esteemed as a theologian and canonist, and his works were used as texts in many institutions of Germany and Austria. His chief works are

- (1) Juris ecclesiastici statu Germaniae maxime et Bavariae ad commodati syntagma (Ratisbon, 1785). When interpolated editions of this work were published (Cologne, 1787, and Bonn, 1789), he re-edited it under the title Institutiones juris eccl. etc. (2 vols., Ingolstadt, 1790-1), but it was again reprinted without his consent (Bonn, 1793, and Cologne, 1794). The latest (11th) edition was prepared by Engelmann (Ratisbon, 1853).
- (2) Ethica christiana universalis (3 vols., Ingolstadt 1800-1, 5th ed., Gran, 1830).
- (3) Theologiae pastoralis systema (Ingolstadt, 1815–25).
