= Auerbach in der Oberpfalz =

- Town
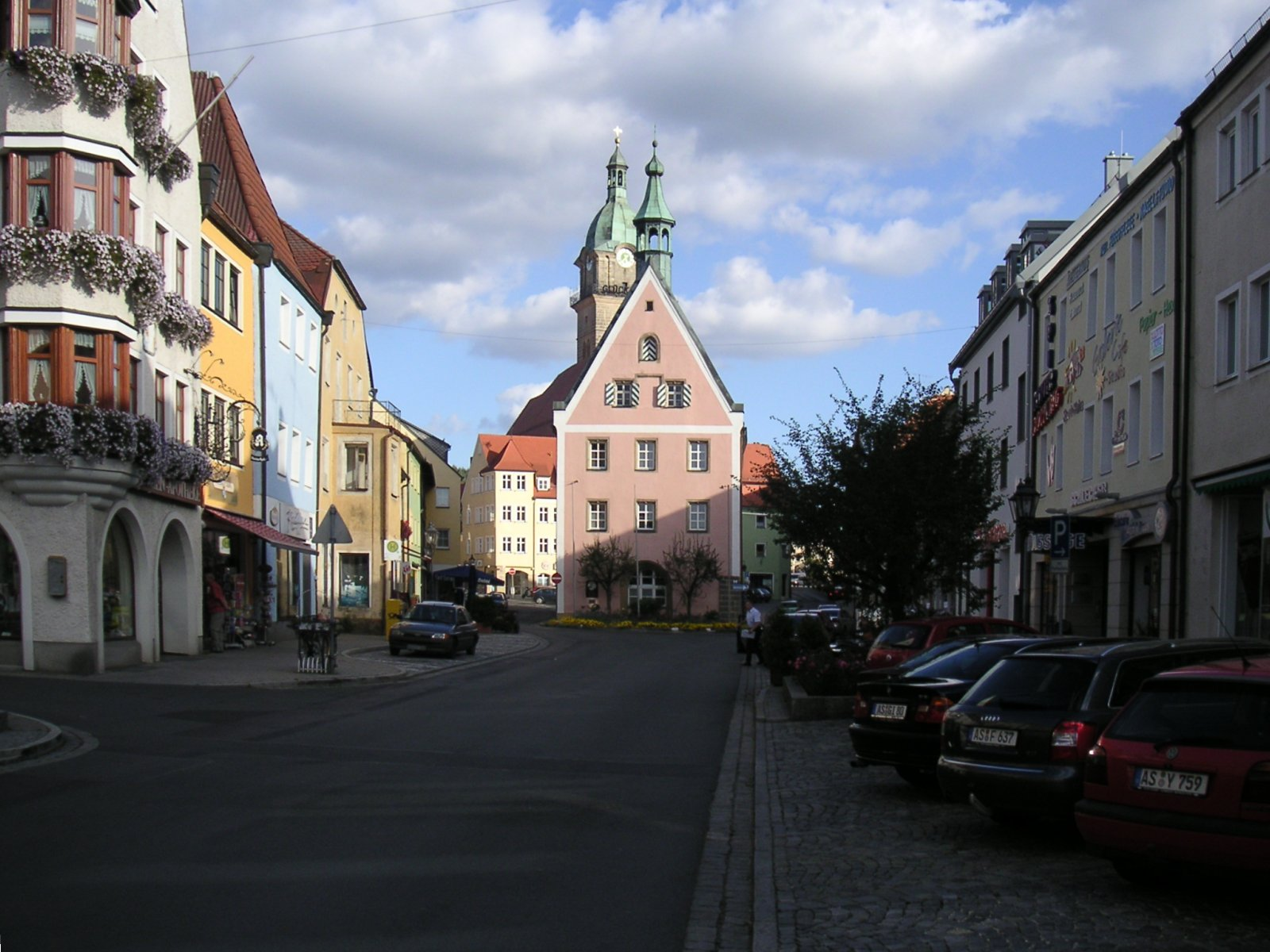
- Center of the town with the town hall

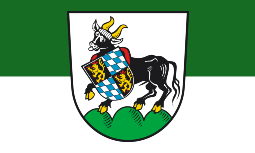
- Flag Coat of arms

- Location of Auerbach in der Oberpfalz within Amberg-Sulzbach district
- Interactive map of Auerbach in der Oberpfalz
- Location within Germany Location within Bavaria
- Coordinates: 49°41′N 11°37′E
- Country: Germany
- State: Bavaria
- Admin. region: Oberpfalz
- District: Amberg-Sulzbach

Government
  - Mayor (2020–26): Joachim Neuß (FW)

Area
  - Total: 70.33 km^{2} (27.15 sq mi)
- Elevation: 435 m (1,427 ft)

Population (2025-12-31)
  - Total: 8,846
  - Density: 125.8/km^{2} (325.8/sq mi)
- Time zone: UTC+01:00 (CET)
  - Summer (DST): UTC+02:00 (CEST)
- Postal codes: 91275
- Dialling codes: 09643
- Vehicle registration: AS
- Website: www.auerbach.de

Auerbach in der Oberpfalz (German pronunciation: [ˈaʊɐbax ʔɪn deːɐ̯ ˈʔoːbɐˌpfalts], lit. 'Auerbach in the Upper Palatinate') is a town in the Amberg-Sulzbach district, Bavaria, Germany. In the subdivision Michelfeld there was a Benedictine monastery which is now a nursing home.

== Geography ==
It is located 45 km northeast of Nuremberg. Apart from the town Auerbach the municipality consists of the following villages:

- Bernreuth
- Degelsdorf
- Dornbach
- Espamühle
- Gunzendorf
- Hagenohe
- Hammerberg
- Hämmerlmühle
- Lehnershof
- Leiten
- Ligenz
- Michelfeld
- Mühldorf
- Nasnitz
- Neumühle
- Niedernhof
- Nitzlbuch
- Ohrenbach
- Ortlesbrunn
- Pferrach
- Ranna
- Ranzenthal
- Rauhenstein
- Reichenbach
- Rosenhof
- Rußhütte
- Saaß
- Sackdilling
- Sägmühle
- Sand
- Speckmühle
- Staubershammer
- Steinamwasser
- Weidlwang
- Welluck
- Zogenreuth

== Mayor ==
Since May 2008 Joachim Neuß is the mayor. Helmut Ott was the mayor 1996–2008.

== Town twinnings ==
- Laneuveville-devant-Nancy, Lorraine, France

== Notable citizens ==
- Johann Baptist Metz (1928-2019), Catholic theologian
- Heinrich Stromer (1476-1542), professor at the Leipzig university, physician and founder of Auerbach's Cellar.
- Johann Michael Doser (1678–1756) artist, mainly in the fields of wood carvings und sculptures for altars
- Maurus von Schenkl (1749-1816), Benedictine theologian, librarian and canonist,
