= Auerbachs Keller =

Restaurant in Leipzig, Germany

Coordinates: 51°20′22″N 12°22′31″E

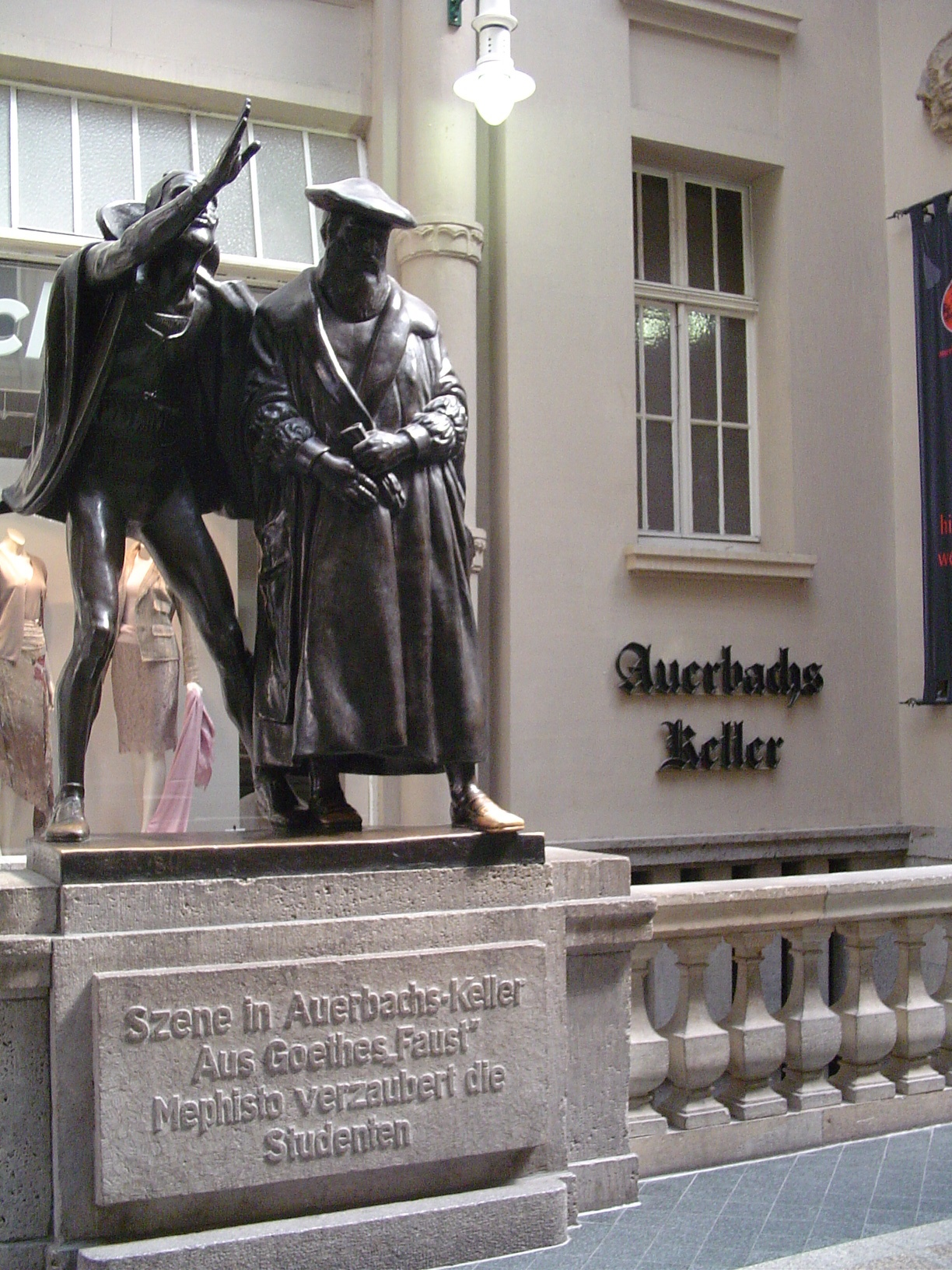
Mephistopheles bewitching the students, sculptures at the Cellar's entrance

Auerbachs Keller (German pronunciation: [ˌaʊɐbaχs ˈkɛlɐ], Auerbach's Cellar in English) is the second oldest restaurant in Leipzig, Germany. Already one of the city's most important wine bars by the 16th century, it owes its worldwide reputation to Goethe's play Faust as the first place Mephistopheles takes Faust on their travels.

== History ==
A wine bar at the site was already mentioned in a historical record dated 1438. The present-day restaurant is located below the Mädlerpassage, a historic covered passage built from 1912 to 1914 at Grimmaische Strasse 2 in Leipzig's historical district near the market. The restaurant has five historical dining rooms: the Fasskeller (Barrel Cellar), Lutherzimmer (Luther Room), Goethezimmer (Goethe Room), Alt-Leipzig (Old Leipzig), and, since 1913, the Großer Keller (Large Cellar). There is also the Mephisto Bar on the floor above available for drinks.

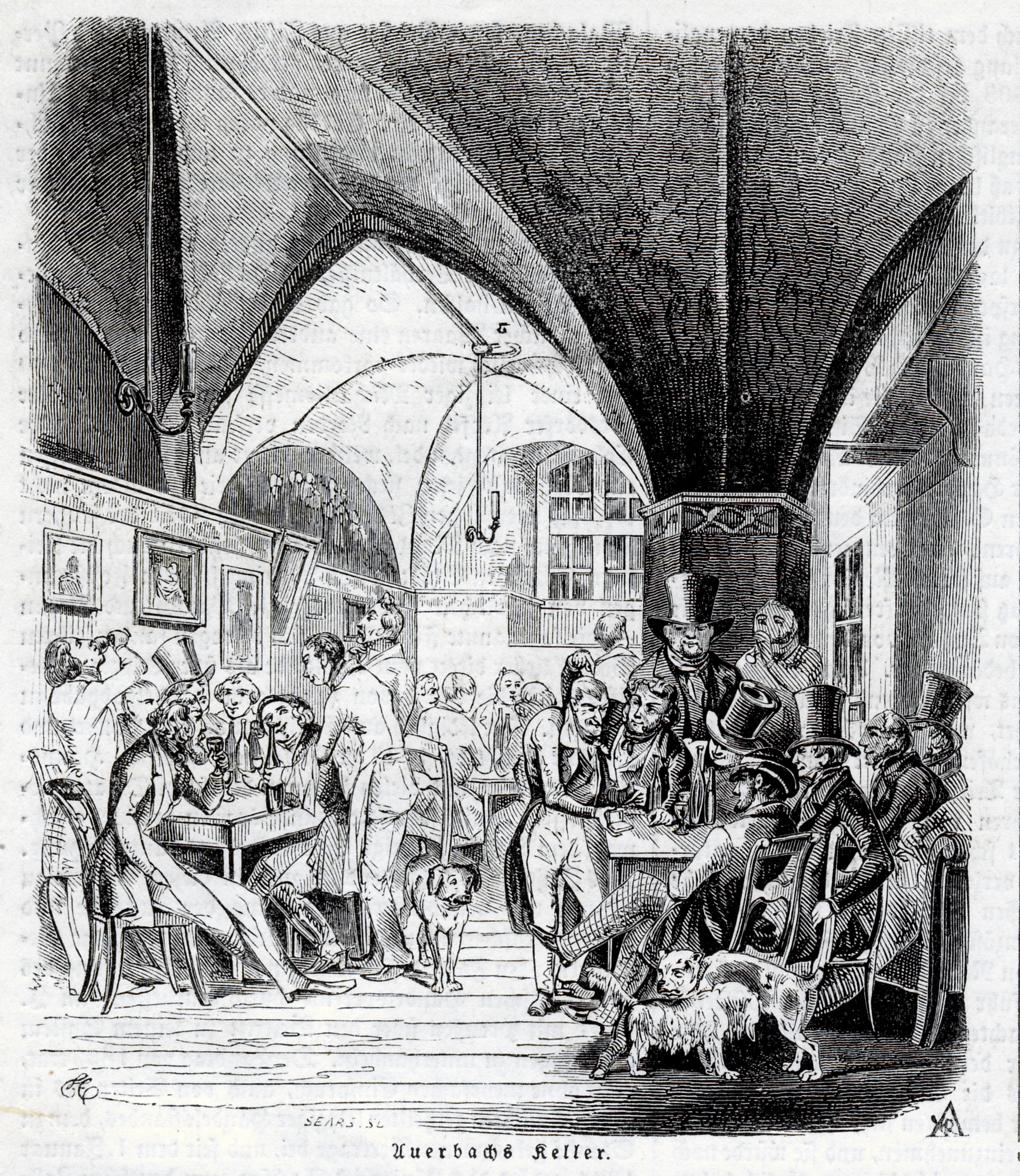
Auerbach's Cellar, depiction from 1844

The Mädlerpassage replaced the former Auerbachs Hof, a trade fair building complex, erected about 1530 at the behest of Heinrich Stromer (1482–1542), city councillor, professor of medicine, and rector of Leipzig University. He was the personal physician of several princes, such as Duke George of Saxony or the Hohenzollern brothers Elector Joachim I of Brandenburg and Archbishop Albert of Mainz. Stromer was familiarly called Doctor Auerbach after his birthplace, the town of Auerbach in the Bavarian Upper Palatinate region. When he re-opened the already existing wine vault in the basement rooms, the bar quickly adopted his name.

Young Goethe often visited Auerbach's Cellar while studying at Leipzig University from 1765 to 1768 and called it his favorite wine bar. He saw there two paintings on wood dating from 1625, one depicting the legendary magician and astrologer Johann Georg Faust drinking with students and the other showing him riding out the door astride a wine barrel, something he could have accomplished only with the help of the Devil. Goethe was already familiar with the Faust legend from his youth, since a puppet show Dr. Faust, was frequently performed at local street fairs. The scene Auerbach’s Cellar in Leipzig in his drama Faust I is his literary memorial to his student tavern and to the city, albeit an ironic one.

Between 1912 and 1913 much of Auerbach's Cellar was reconstructed and expanded as part of the demolition of the medieval construction above it and the erection of the Mädlerpassage. It was reopened on 22 February 1913, which is also the date when the two sculptures Mephisto and Faust and Bewitched Students were placed at the entrance. Since German reunification, the whole passage with numerous shops and office floors has been extensively renovated.

== See also ==
- List of arcade galleries in Leipzig
- Goethe Monument (Leipzig)
