= Johann Suibert Seibertz =

German lawyer, judge, and historian

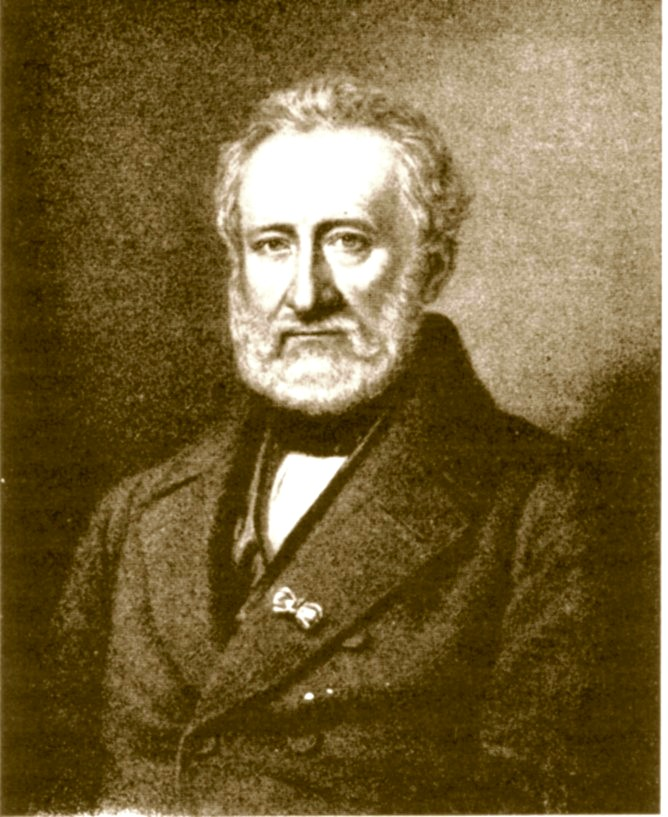

Johann Suibert Seibertz (27 November 1788, Brilon – 17 November 1871, Arnsberg) was a German lawyer, judge and historian. His eldest son Engelbert Seibertz was a painter.
