= Heinrich Stromer =

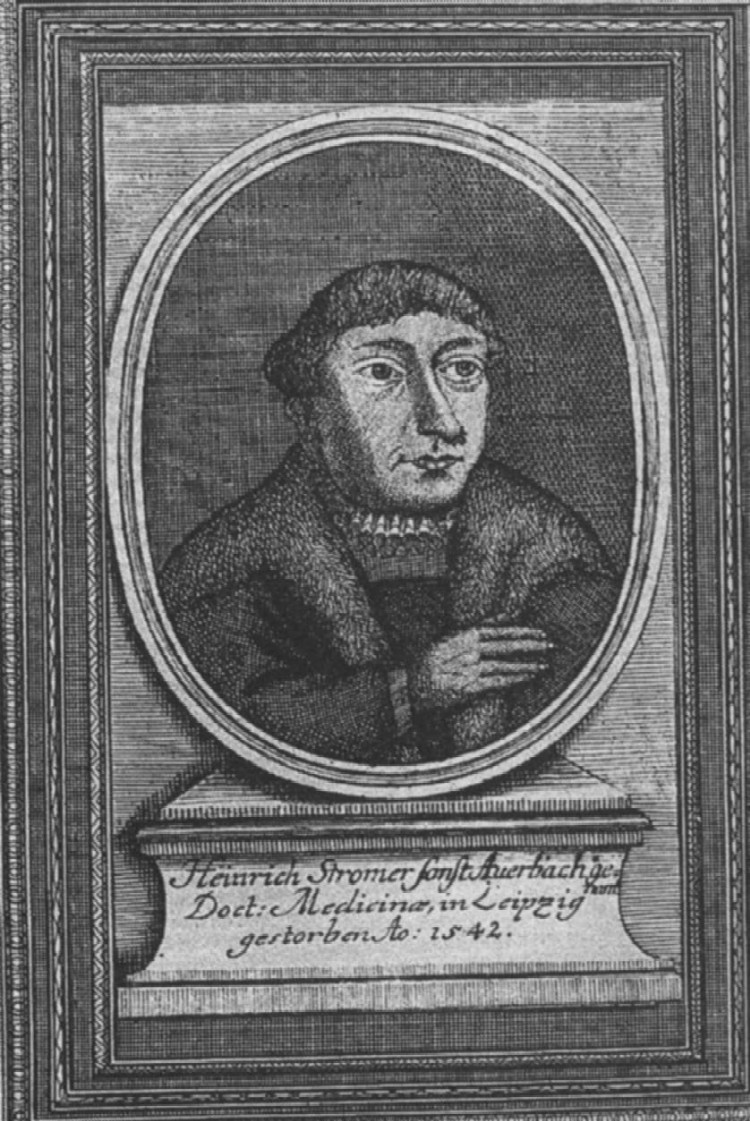

Heinrich Stromer (c. 1476 – 1542) was a physician of the German Renaissance, professor rector at the University of Leipzig and founder of Auerbachs Keller.

Born in Auerbach in der Oberpfalz, he enrolled at Leipzig University in 1497, receiving the title of magister in 1501 and a professorship in philosophy as well as the office of rector in 1508. He graduated in medicine in 1511, and was professor of pathology from 1516 and dean of the medical faculty from 1523. He was popularly known as Dr. Auerbach after his native town.

He married Anna Hummelshain, daughter of a rich Leipzig patrician, in 1519. He built Auerbachs Hof during 1530–1538

Stromer was personal physician to several noblemen, including George, Duke of Saxony, Joachim I Nestor, Elector of Brandenburg and Albert of Brandenburg. During the Protestant Reformation he was in correspondence with Martin Luther, Philipp Melanchthon, Ulrich von Hutten and Erasmus von Rotterdam.

== Works ==
- Algorithmus linealis numerationem, Additionem, Subtractionem, Duplationem, Mediationem, Multiplicationem, Divisionem et Progressionem una cum regula de Tri perstringens. Leipzig (Martin Landsberg) 1504
- Opusculum observationum bone valitudinis, quod vulgo regimen sanitatis inscribitur Arnaldi de noua villa. ca. 1510
- Saluberrimae adversus pestilentiam observationes. 1516
- Duae epistolae Henrici Stromeri Auerbachii et Gregori Coppi Calvi medicorum. Leipzig 1520
- Sermo panegyricus Petro Mosellanus. Leipzig 1520
- Decreta aliquot medica, quae in disquisitiones publicam proponentur. Leipzig 1532
- De morte hominis decreta aliquot medica. Leipzig 1531
- Decreta medica et senectute.
