= Engelbert Seibertz (painter) =

German painter

Engelbert Seibertz (20 April 1813, Brilon – 2 October 1905, Arnsberg) was a German portraitist and history painter.

== Life ==
He was the eldest son of Johann Suibert Seibertz (1788–1871). He was only moderately successful in school and at age 17 he went to the Kunstakademie Düsseldorf, where he was taught by Carl Friedrich Lessing, Wilhelm von Schadow, Peter von Cornelius and Theodor Hildebrandt. His first surviving independent work was a drawing of the Bruchhauser Steine.

He then moved to the Academy of Fine Arts, Munich in 1832. There he met Louis I of Bavaria's court painter Wilhelm von Kaulbach. Whilst in Munich he produced 74 artworks, including two monumental frescoes in the Maximilianeum. He moved back to his birthplace in 1835, making sketches and illustrations for Faust before moving to Prague for seven years in 1841 then Munich for twenty years in 1850. He created a total of 300 works for Maximilian II of Bavaria and designed glass windows for Glasgow Cathedral (removed during World War Two and not yet reinstated). He finally moved to Arnsberg in 1870, producing 140 more paintings before his death, mainly of well-known families from Sauerland.
