= Claudia Jung =

German singer and politician

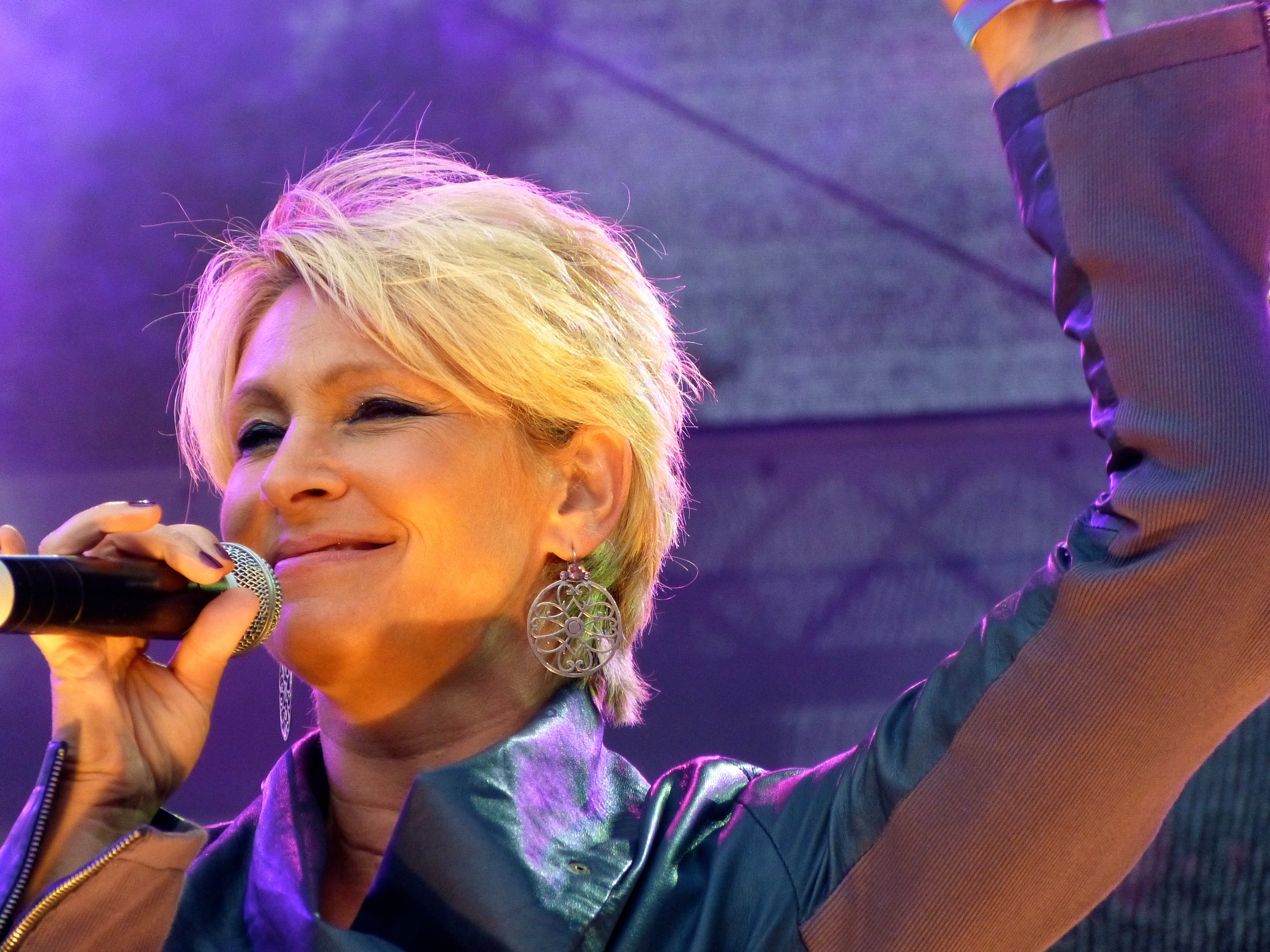
- Claudia Jung (2012)
- Born: 12 April 1964 (age 62); Ratingen, North Rhine-Westphalia, West Germany

Claudia Jung (born Ute Krummenast; 12 April 1964) is a German Schlager singer and politician.

== Biography ==
Ich kann nur in der Sprache singen, in der ich auch träume..I can sing only in the language in which I also dream...

— Claudia Jung

Jung was born in Ratingen, North Rhine-Westphalia. From 1974 till 1980, she attended the school Liebfrauenschule in Ratingen. As a child she took guitar lessons and during her schooltime she sang in the Amt-Angerland-Chor. Before her career in show business she worked as a photo lab technician, a dental assistant and a tourist guide in Italy. Every now and then she performed as a non-professional singer.

In 1984, she met the music producer Adam Schairer with whom she subsequently made experimental recordings. She made her first single releases in collaboration with Schairer and the composer and producer Jean Frankfurter as well as the lyricist Erich Offierowski. The debut album Halt' mich fest ("Hold me tight") was released in 1988. Since 1999 her albums have been produced by Hans Singer with André Franke as co-producer.

During her career, Claudia Jung has achieved multiple gold and platinum records. She has also been awarded various prizes such as the Echo-Preis, Goldene Stimmgabel and the Fred-Jay-Textdichterpreis. Jung has had duets with many international stars including Richard Clayderman (e.g. "Je t'aime mon amour"), Rosanna Perinic ("Domani l'amore vincerà"), Nino de Angelo ("Hand in Hand") and Cliff Richard ("Mistletoe and Wine"). She sings mainly in her native language, German, but has also interpreted songs in English, French and Italian.

In 2004, she recorded a duet "Heut' fliegt ein Engel durch die Nacht" with her daughter Anna.

Since November 2007, Claudia Jung has been the protector of a childcare project for traumatized children who have lost faith in themselves, other people and the surrounding world.

In 2008, she debuted as actress, appearing as the female lead in the television series of the ARD (First German channel): Das Musikhotel am Wolfgangsee (The Musical hotel on Lake Wolfgang).

On 2 March 2008 Claudia Jung - officially Ute Singer - was elected as representative of the group Freie Wähler in the county council of Pfaffenhofen. She also works as a councilwoman of the Christliche Wählergemeinschaft in the community of Gerolsbach. In the state election on 28 September 2008 Claudia Jung was elected as representative of the Freie Wähler in the Landtag of Bavaria.

During her career, Claudia Jung has sold more than 445,000 records, most albums. The most commercially successful album was the same name "Claudia Jung".

== Private life ==
Claudia Jung's first husband was her former manager Jürgen Evers, whom she married in Düsseldorf on 1 September 1993. The marriage ended the following year and they were divorced. At the same time Jung met current husband Hans Singer, whom she married in 1997. The couple has a daughter, Anna Charlotte, born on 4 August 1997. Hans Singer has a son, David, a few years older. The family has lived since 1998 in a farm in Gerolsbach, district of Pfaffenhofen an der Ilm (Upper Bavaria). They have many animals living on the farm (about fifty between horses, goats, dogs and cats, etc.) Claudia Jung is an animal-friend, respecting and loving nature, and among her passions is vegetarianism.

In early 1994, Claudia Jung, following a bad fall from her horse (equestrianism is her favorite sport), suffered a double fracture of the skull base. Some months later she also suffered a paralysis of the vocal cords, which forced her into a period of rest and to halt her touring. Her comeback in September of that year, with the song "Je t'aime mon amour" in tandem with the pianist Richard Clayderman, however, was phenomenal. This romantic ballad (in German and French version) is one of her greatest hits. In 2005, Claudia Jung again suffered a paralysis of the vocal cords, which once again forced her for a few months to halt some of her touring.

== Discography ==
=== Singles ===
- 06/1986 Immer wieder eine Handvoll Zärtlichkeit
- 02/1987 Träume sterben nie
- 09/1987 Amore Amore
- 06/1988 Atemlos
- 10/1988 Halt' mich fest
- 04/1989 Roter Horizont
- 08/1998 Stumme Signale
- 01/1990 Etwas für die Ewigkeit
- 04/1990 Eine Reise ins Licht
- 08/1990 Fang mich auf
- 12/1990 Er war wie du
- 04/1991 Mittsommernacht
- 07/1991 Schmetterlinge
- 11/1991 Wo kommen die Träume her
- 07/1992 Du ich lieb’ Dich
- 11/1192 Das Dunkel der Nacht
- 04/1993 Lass mich doch nochmal
- 03/1994 Unter meiner Haut
- 09/1994 Je t’aime mon amour (duet with Richard Clayderman)
- 03/1995 Komm und tanz ein letztes Mal mit mir
- 10/1995 Wer die Sehnsucht kennt
- 03/1996 Domani l’amore vincerà (duet with Rosanna Perinic)
- 10/1996 Ein Lied, das von Liebe erzählt
- 12/1996 Weihnachtszeit - Mistletoe and Wine (duet with Cliff Richard)
- 08/1997 Lieb mich nochmal
- 01/1998 Ich vermiss’ Dich zu sehr
- 10/1998 Hand in Hand (duet with Nino de Angelo)
- 02/1999 Nur mit Dir
- 06/1999 Wo die Freiheit beginnt
- 09/1999 Frieden allezeit (duet with Corinna May)
- 08/2001 Auch wenn es nicht vernünftig ist
- 12/2001 Hast Du alles vergessen
- 04/2002 Und dann tanz' ich ganz allein
- 09/2002 Wenn es morgen nicht mehr gibt
- 02/2003 Tausendmal ja
- 03/1993 Ich denk' immer noch an Dich
- 05/2003 Mittenrein ins Glück
- 09/2003 Seelenfeuer
- 06/2004 Heut' fliegt ein Engel durch die Nacht (duet with Anna Charlotte)
- 09/2004 Ich kann für nichts mehr garantier’n
- 01/2005 Um den Schlaf gebracht
- 05/2005 Geh’n wir zu mir oder zu Dir
- 04/2006 Bleib doch heut’ Nacht
- 08/2006 Hey, 'nen kleinen Schuss, denn hattest Du doch schon immer
- 01/2007 Träumen erlaubt
- 04/2007 Sommerwein, wie die Liebe süß und wild (duet with Nik P.)
- 08/2007 Ich darf mich nicht in Dich verlieben
- 10/2007 Ein Tag zu wenig
- 03/2008 Mir schenkst Du Rosen
- 06/2008 Lass uns noch einmal lügen
- 10/2008 Die Träume einer Frau
- 02/2009 Tausend Frauen
- 09/2009 Mein Herz lässt Dich nie alleine

=== Albums ===
- Halt' mich fester (Intercord 1988)
- Etwas für die Ewigkeit (Intercord 1989)
- Spuren einer Nacht (Intercord 1990)
- Wo kommen die Träume her (Intercord 1991)
- Nah bei Dir - Ausgewählte Lieder (Intercord 1992)
- Du ich lieb' Dich (EMI 1992)
- Claudia Jung (EMI 1994)
- Sehnsucht (EMI 1995)
- Winterträume (EMI 1996)
- Augenblicke (EMI 1997)
- Für immer (BMG 1999)
- Auch wenn es nicht vernünftig ist (Polydor 2001)
- Auch wenn es nicht vernünftig ist (with bonus Koch 2002)
- Best of (Electrola 2002)
- Seelenfeuer (Koch 2003)
- Herzzeiten (Koch 2004)
- Träumen erlaubt (Koch 2006)
- Sommerwein, meine schönsten Sommersongs (Koch 2007)
- Unwiderstehlich (Koch 2007)
- Hemmungslos Liebe (Koch 2008)
- Hemmungslos Liebe (DeLuxe edition Koch 2008)
- Geheime Zeichen (Koch 2009)
- Geliebt, gelacht, geweint - Best of (Koch 2010)
- Geliebt, gelacht, geweint - Best Of - MegaMix (Koch 07/2011)
- Alles nach Plan? (Universal 2012)
- Seitensprung (Universal 2015)
- Frauenherzen (Universal 2016)
- Schicksal, Zufall oder Glück (Universal 2018)

=== DVDs ===
- Claudia Jung - Mein München (Polydor 2001)
- Hemmungslos Liebe (DVD Koch 2008 limited-Edition)
- Geliebt, gelacht, geweint (DVD Koch 2010 Limited-Edition)

=== Awards ===
- Echo Musikpreis - 1994 e 2000
- Goldene Stimmgabel - 1995, 1996, 1997, 1998 e 2002
- Amadeus Austrian Music Award - 2002
- Fred-Jay-Preis - 2002

=== Awards (number of sale) ===
Goldene Schallplatte

- Germany
  - 1995: Album "Claudia Jung"
- Austria
  - 1991: Album "Spuren einer Nacht"
  - 1996: Album "Winterträume"
  - 1999: Album "Für immer"
  - 2004: Album "Auch wenn es nicht vernünftig ist"
  - 2005: Album "Herzzeiten"
  - 2008: Album "Unwiderstehlich"
  - 2009: Album "Hemmungslos Liebe"
- Switzerland
  - 1995: Album "Claudia Jung"

Platin-Schallplatte

- Austria
  - 1996: Album "Sehnsucht"
  - 1997: Album "Augenblicke"
  - 1998: Album "Du ich lieb’ dich"

2x Platin-Schallplatte

- Austria
  - 1995: Album "Claudia Jung"

Country	Gold	Platin
Germany	1	0
Austria	7	5
Switzerland	1	0
Total	9	5
