= Engelbrechtsmünster =

- Village
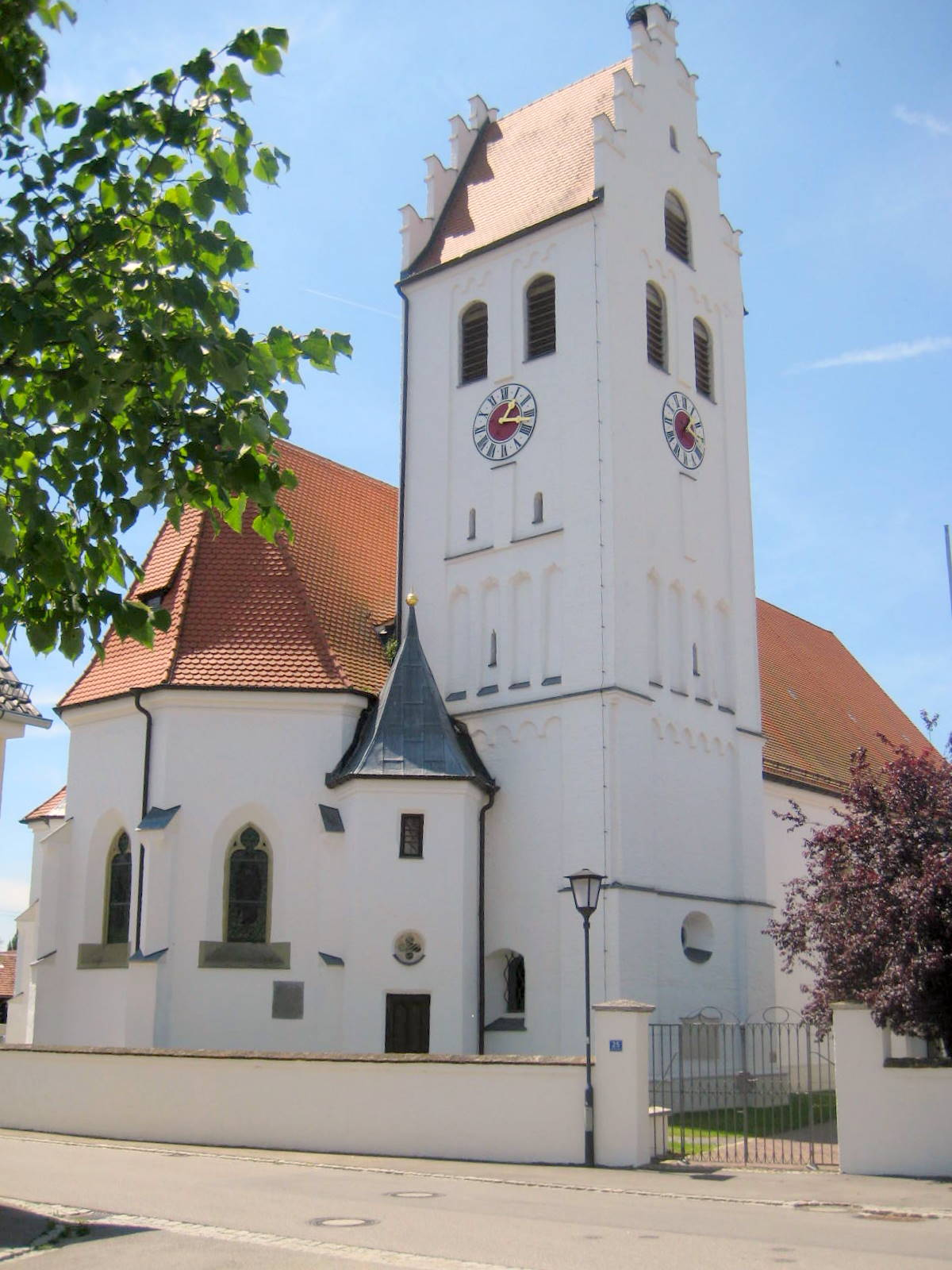
- Parish church

- Location in Bavaria
- Coordinates: 48.693333°N 11.633333°E
- Country: Germany
- State: Bavaria
- Region: Upper Bavaria
- Municipality: Geisenfeld
- Time zone: UTC+1 (CET)
  - Summer (DST): UTC+2 (CEST)
- Postal code: 85290
- Website: www.engelbrechtsmuenster.de

Engelbrechtsmünster is a village in Bavaria, Germany, now part of the municipality of Geisenfeld. It lies near the Ilm river.

== History ==
There was a monastery in the village, thought to have been founded by pupils of the Irish missionary Columbanus at the start of the 6th century. Saint Emmeram of Regensburg probably visited the small monastery around 650. The monks would not have lived together, but scattered in cells throughout the parish, which was extensive in the early days. Around 815 a Benedictine monk rebuilt the Ilm Monastery, which was endowed with lands in the region. The monastery was destroyed around 955 AD by the Hungarians. The inhabitants rebuilt the church of Saint Paul im Moos. The only remains of the monastery is the word "münster" in the village name. In 1030 Geisenfeld Abbey was founded nearby to replace the Ilm Monastery.

A tower-like castle was built around 800, partly destroyed in 954-55, rebuilt in 1051 and in 1400 converted into a chapel. It was used by the people of Engelbrechtsmünster until 1827. The parish of Engelbrechtsmünster was the second largest in the diocese of Regensburg, and one of the best endowed. It had a number of churches and supported a pastor and several chaplains. In 1971 the village was incorporated into the neighboring town of Geisenfeld. A village renewal project was undertaken in 2010. As of 2012 there were 376 inhabitants.

== Gallery ==
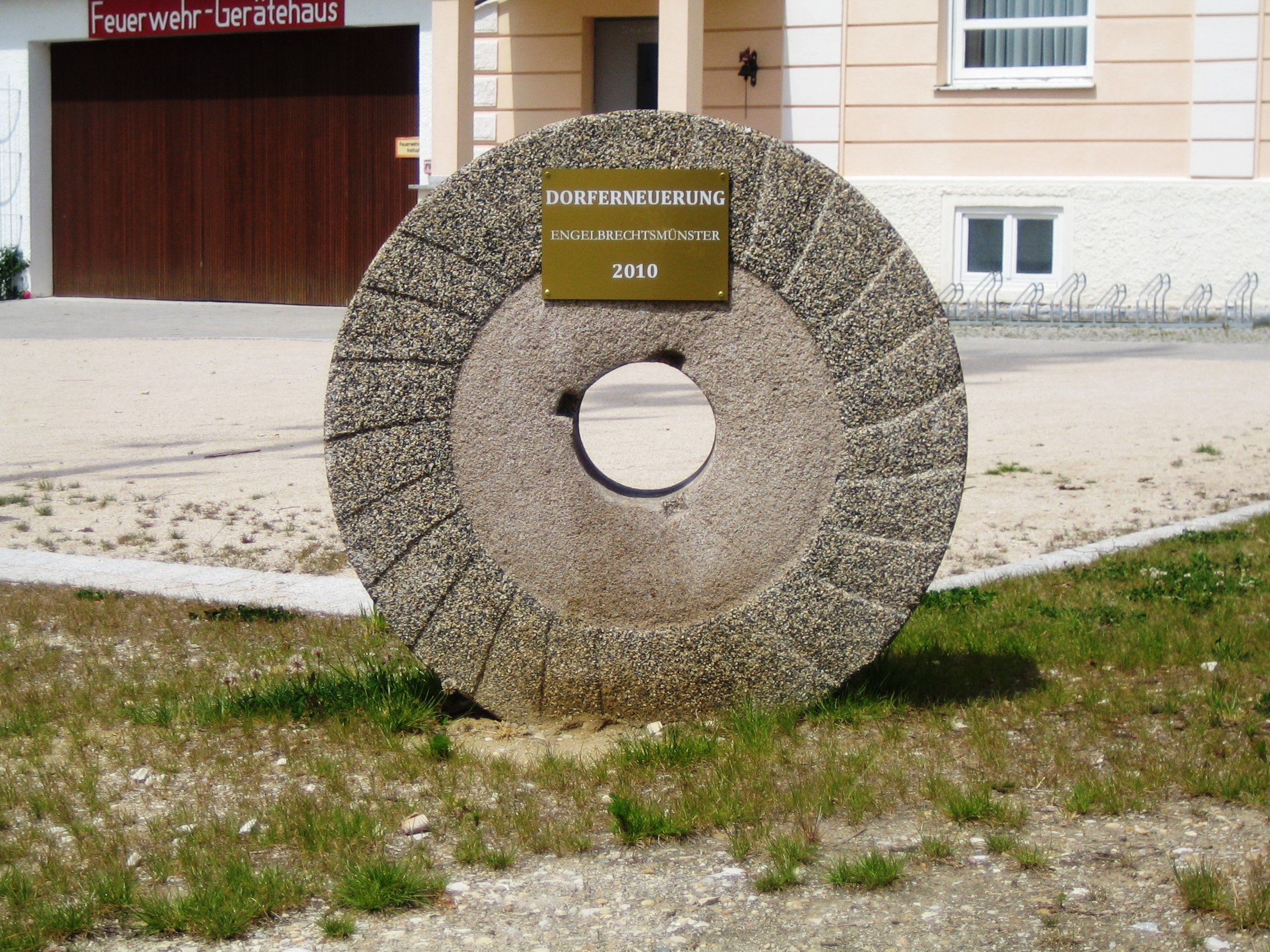
Monument to the 2010 village renewal

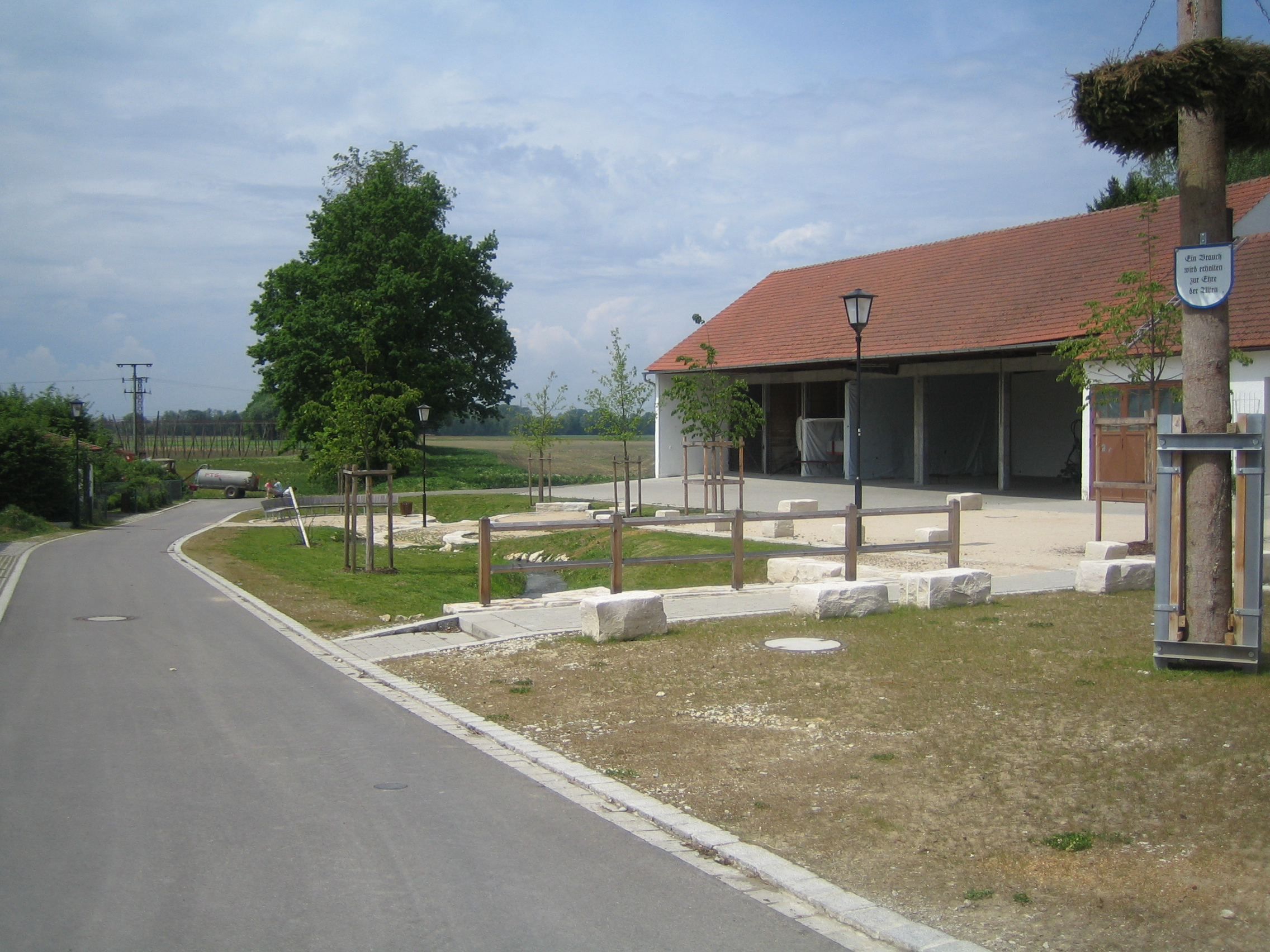
2010 redesigned village square

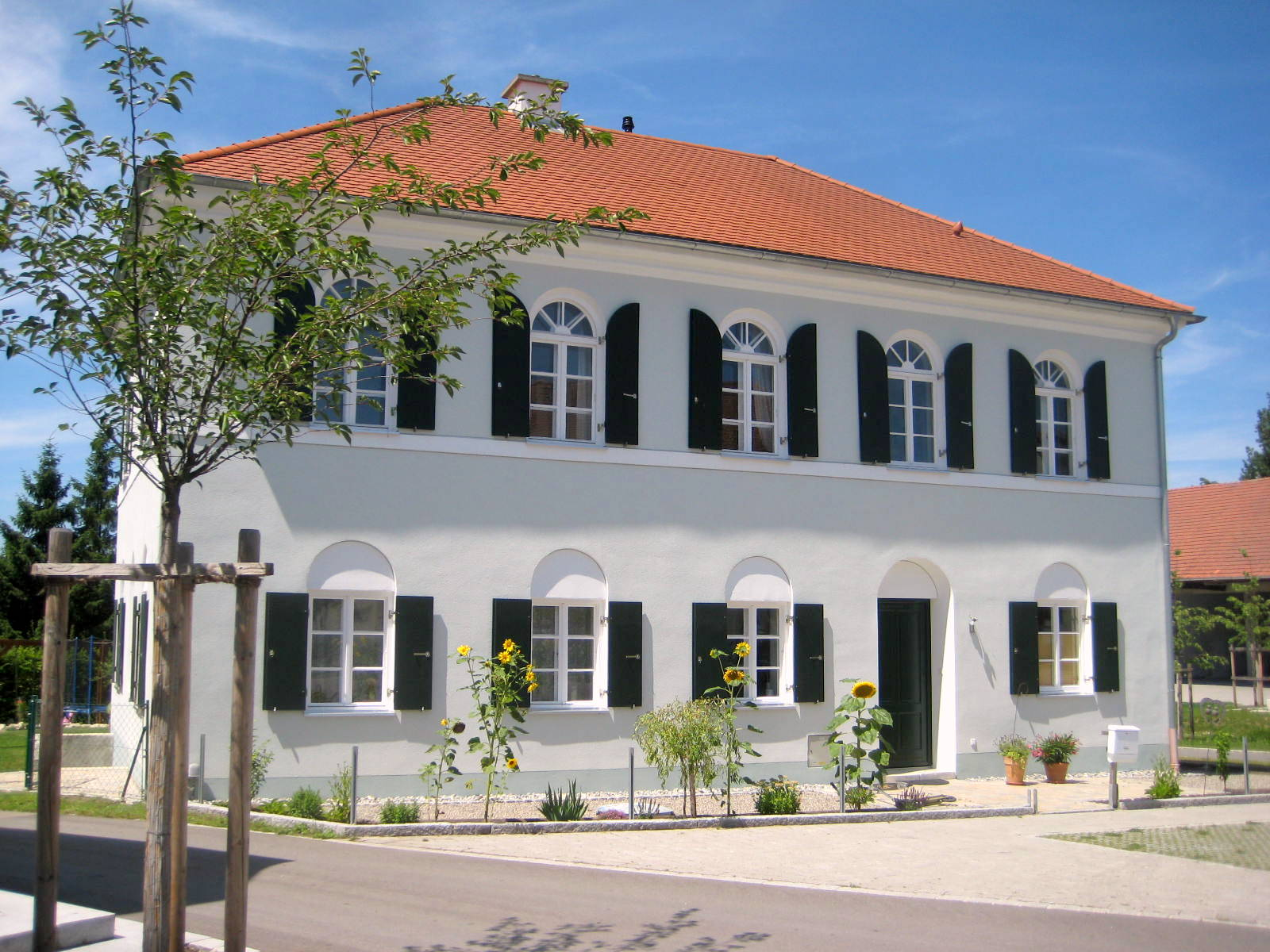
Teacher's residence

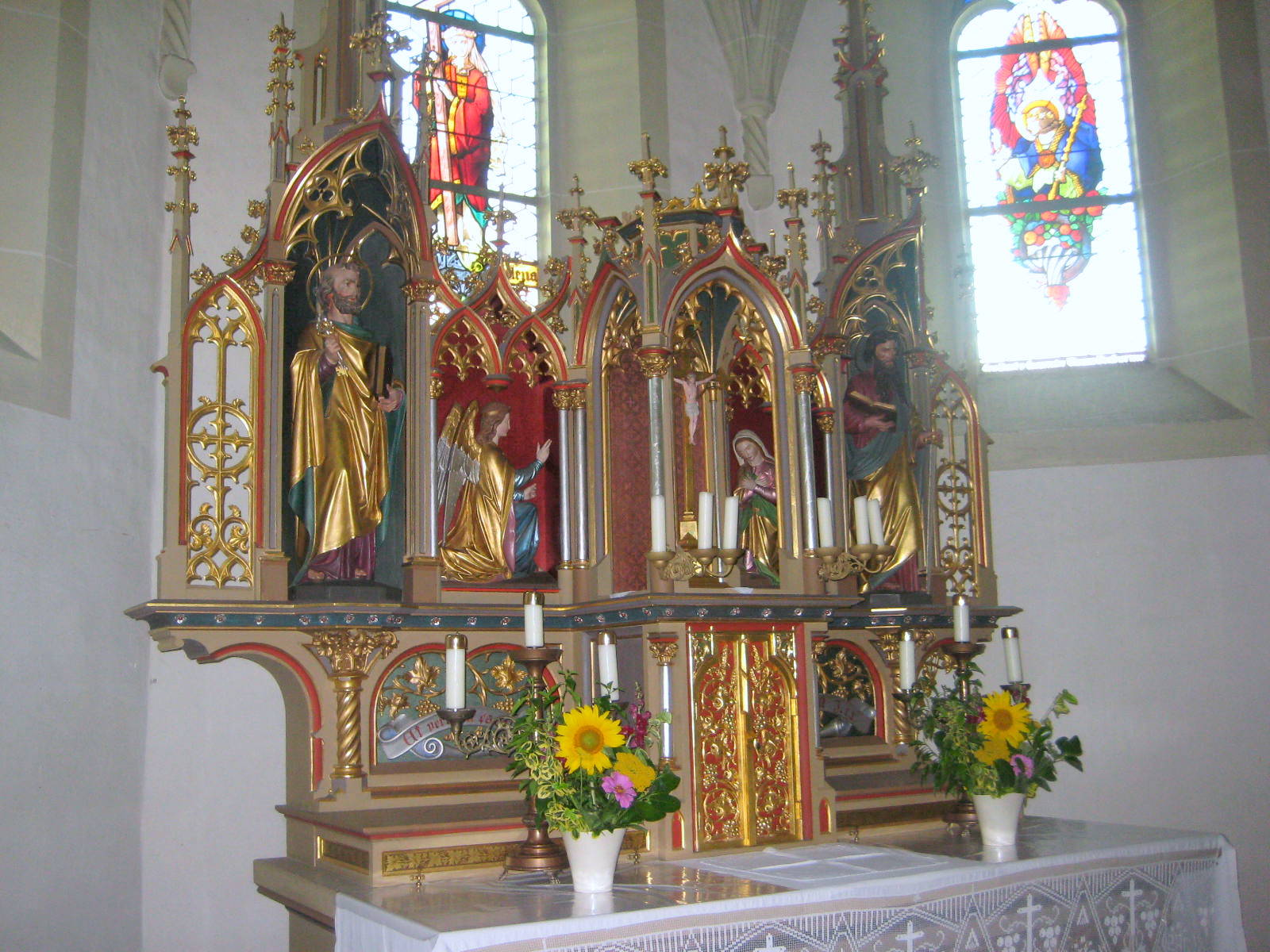
Parish church altar

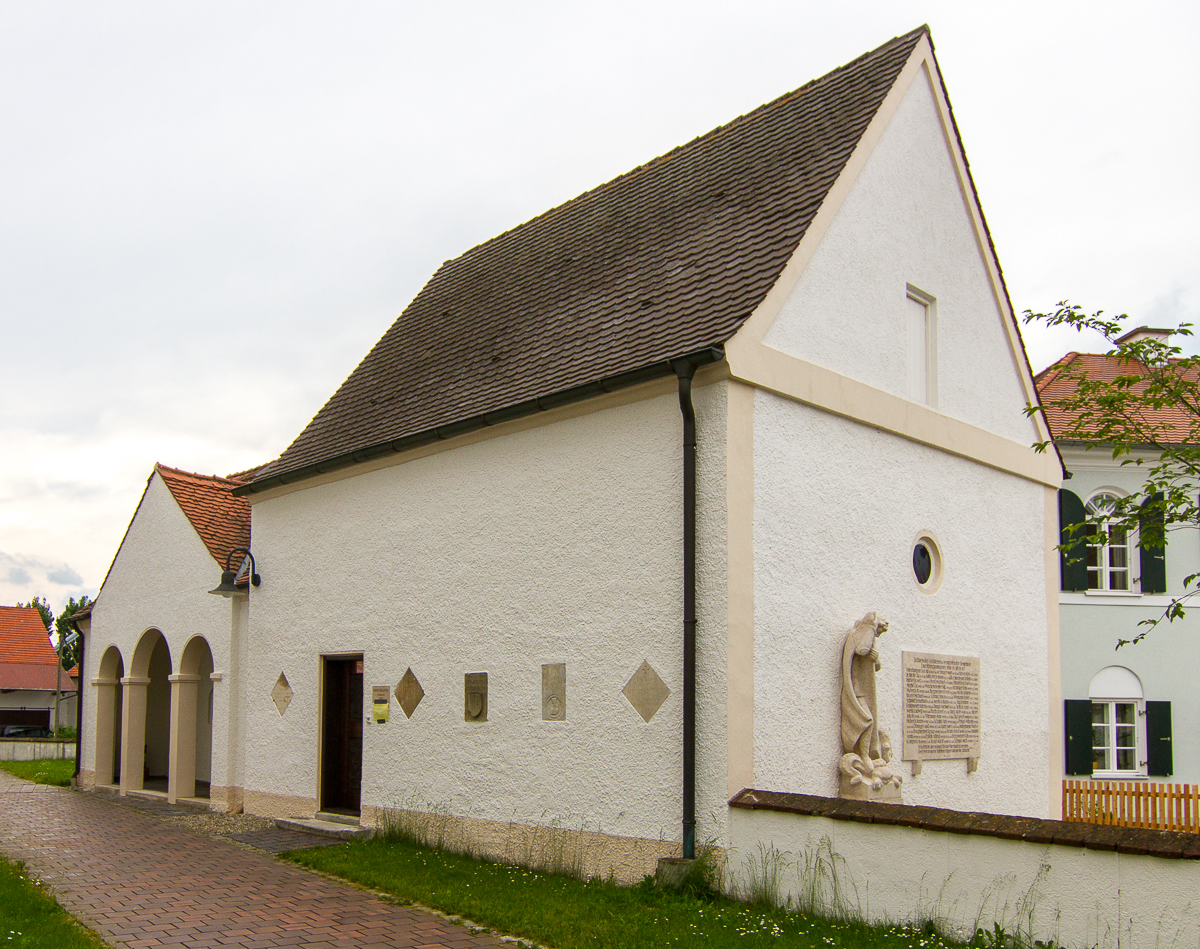
Chapel (Bavarian cultural monument no. D-1-86-122-48)
