= Rohr, Pfaffenhofen =

Village in Bavaria, Germany

Coordinates: 48.602°N 11.528°E

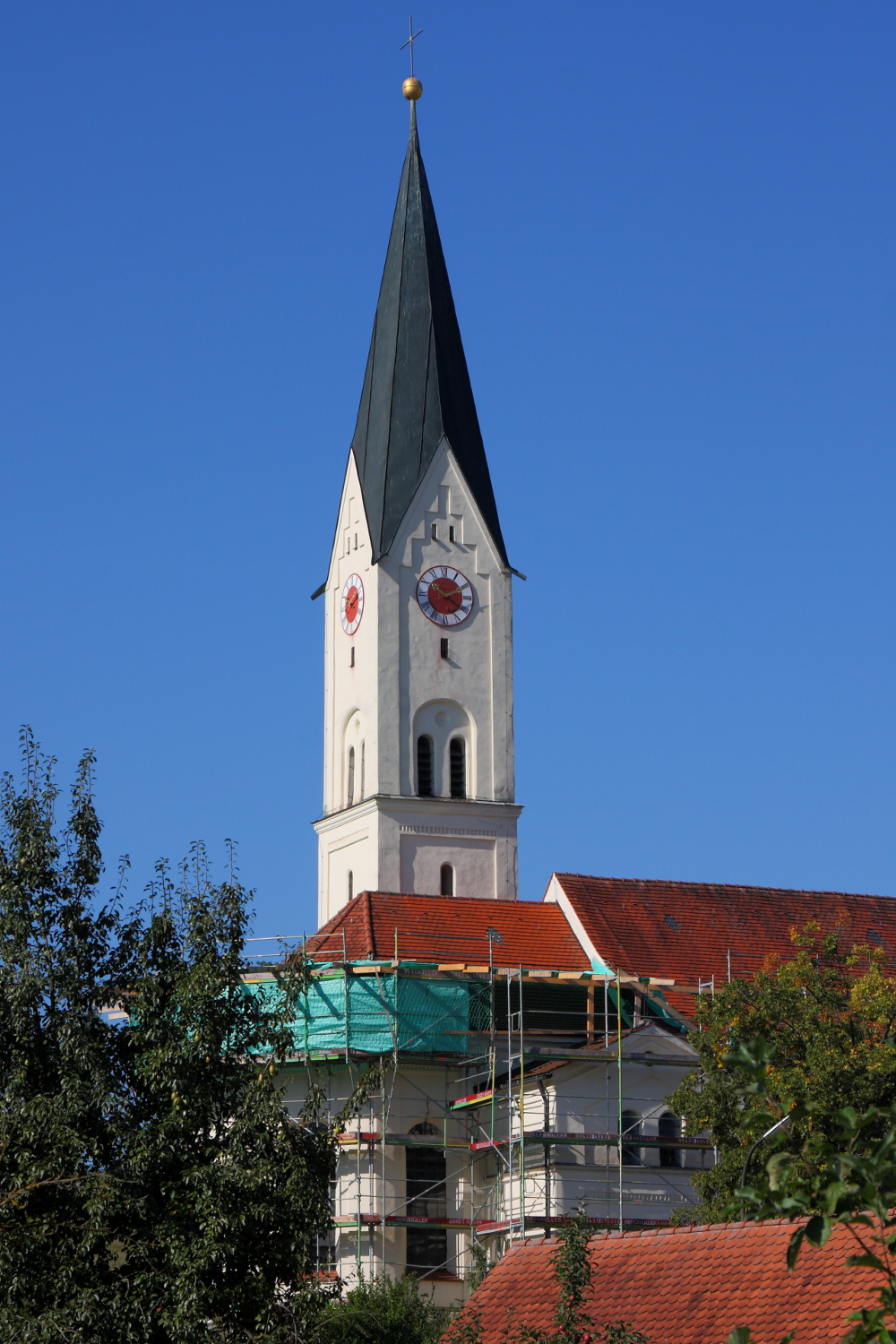
Church of Saint Stephen

Rohr is a small village in the municipality of Rohrbach in the district of Pfaffenhofen in Upper Bavaria in Bavaria, Germany and had a population of 160 in 2007.
