= Geisenfeld Abbey =

- German: Kloster Geisenfeld
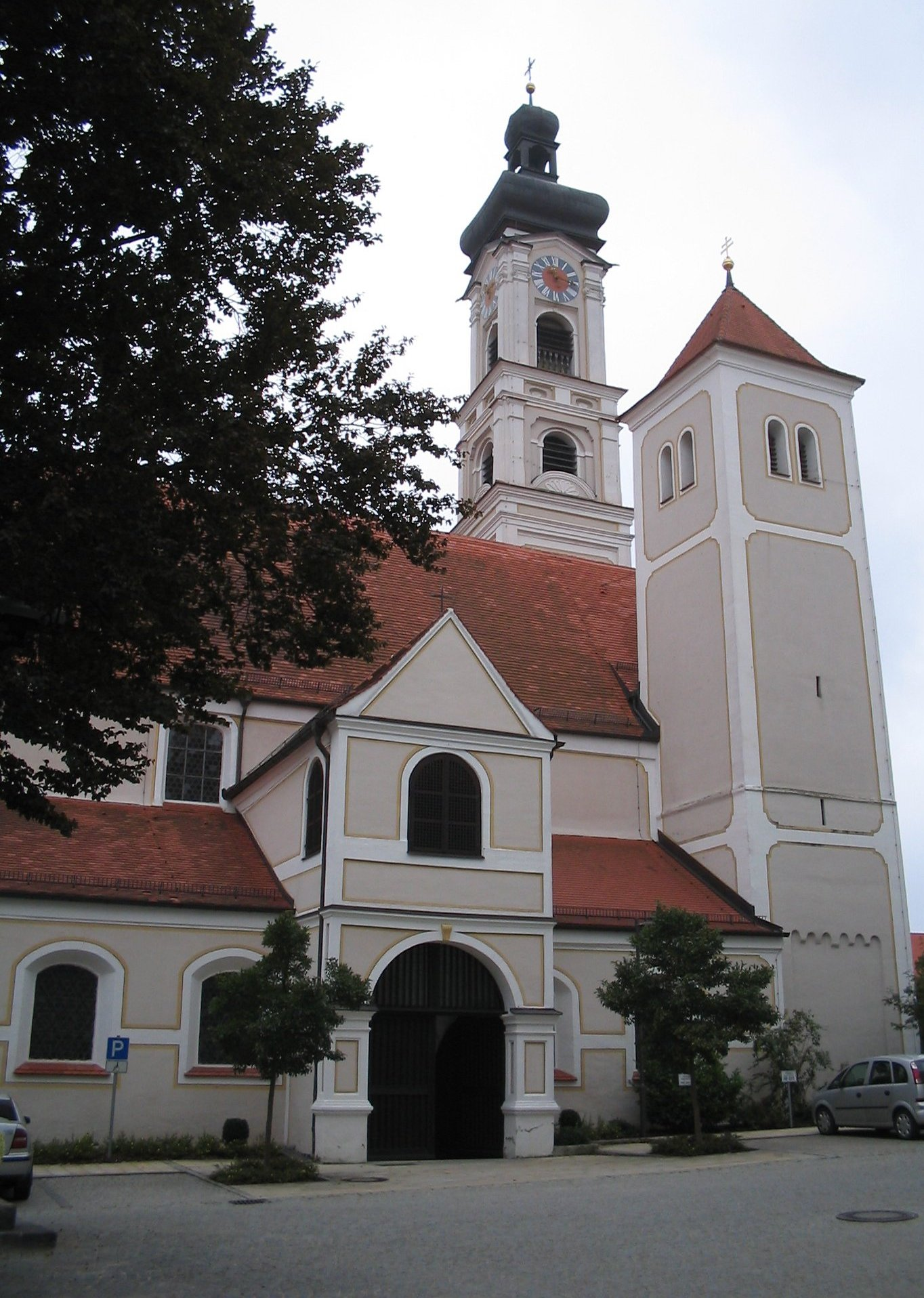
- Former convent church, now the parish church of Geisenfeld (2006)

- Location within Bavaria
- Interactive map of Geisenfeld Abbey

Monastery information
- Order: Benedictine
- Established: 1037
- Disestablished: 1804

Site
- Coordinates: 48.683256°N 11.613472°E

Geisenfeld Abbey (German: Kloster Geisenfeld) was a convent in Bavaria, Germany, in the town of Geisenfeld. It was founded in 1037 and dissolved in 1804. At one time it was one of the most prosperous convents in Bavaria.

== Foundation ==
Count Eberhard II, the last male descendant of the Sempt und Ebersberg family, and his wife Adelheit founded Geisenfeld Abbey in 1030 after their three children had died leaving no descendants. It replaced a monastery in today's Engelbrechtsmünster that had been destroyed around 955 AD by the Hungarians. The founders gave the abbey a lavish endowment. Instead of monks, as before, the Abbey was for use by nuns of the Order of Saint Benedict from noble families. (Note: Even before the Reformation, the founders wishes were not completely observed, and young women were admitted who were not noble by birth.) It accommodated about 50 nuns. The first abbess was the sister of Count Eberhard II, Gerbirgis.

== Structure ==
The abbey complex was designed by Benedictines from St. Emmeram's Abbey in Regensburg, who started construction in 1030 in a new location, higher up and further from the Ilm river. The foundations were rock, the ground floor brick and the upper floor was half-timbered. A round chapel in the late Romanesque style has survived from the original abbey. The abbey church was built beside the old parish church, which was dedicated to Saint Emmeram of Regensburg. Both stood side by side at the present churchyard. The abbey church has a picture of the Count and his family handing over their possessions to the Virgin Mary, and contains the grave of the count. The painting dates from 1770.

== History ==
At one time Geisenfeld Abbey was one of the largest and richest convents in Bavaria. The abbey owned large parts of Gaimersheim near Ingolstadt and the village of Sandsbach, administered by two provosts subordinate to the abbey's provost. The inhabitants of the monastic lands had to pay tithes to the abbey and were subject to the monastic provost's court, apart from serious crimes. The abbess also had the right to appoint ministers to the parishes of Gaimersheim and Sandsbach. The nuns provided education to the people of their lands. They did not always insist on full payment of tithes, and sometimes waived them altogether.

In 1131 the nuns founded a brewery near today's Schloss Herrngiersdorf to supply beer to their extensive possessions in the area. It was able to deliver 20,000 litres (4,400 imp gal; 5,300 US gal) of beer annually. In 1501 the building located at the top of Mühlberg (Mill hill) included a brewery, maltings, mill and blacksmith. Some traces of this building remain today. The abbey also had a sawmill, bakery, pharmacy and workshops for handicrafts.

In 1483 the monasteries were reformed. The Abbess Helene Prunner was replaced by Barbara Snäkler from the convent of Bergen, Neuburg. Between 1701 and 1712 the monastery was reconstructed. The redesigned abbey church was consecrated in 1730. As late as 1752 the abbey still held 189 estates in 36 communities.

== Dissolution ==
The abbey was dissolved on 18 March 1803 during the Bavarian secularization program. At that time there were 29 nuns and 21 lay sisters led by the abbess Amanda Donaubauer (1794–1803). The abbey was already in financial difficulties due to the costs of war and construction. The abbey's church became the parish church, dedicated to the Assumption of Mary. In 1805 the former parish church was deconsecrated and converted for other use. It was later demolished.

There was an attempt to revive the monastic tradition in 1921–22, but it failed. The former abbey was occupied by a district court. A wing of the former abbey has been preserved. The spacious baroque building still dominates Geisenfeld. The 54 metres (177 ft) church tower with its bulb-shaped dome is a conspicuous landmark. Because of its size, the church is often called the "Cathedral of the Hallertau".

== Gallery ==
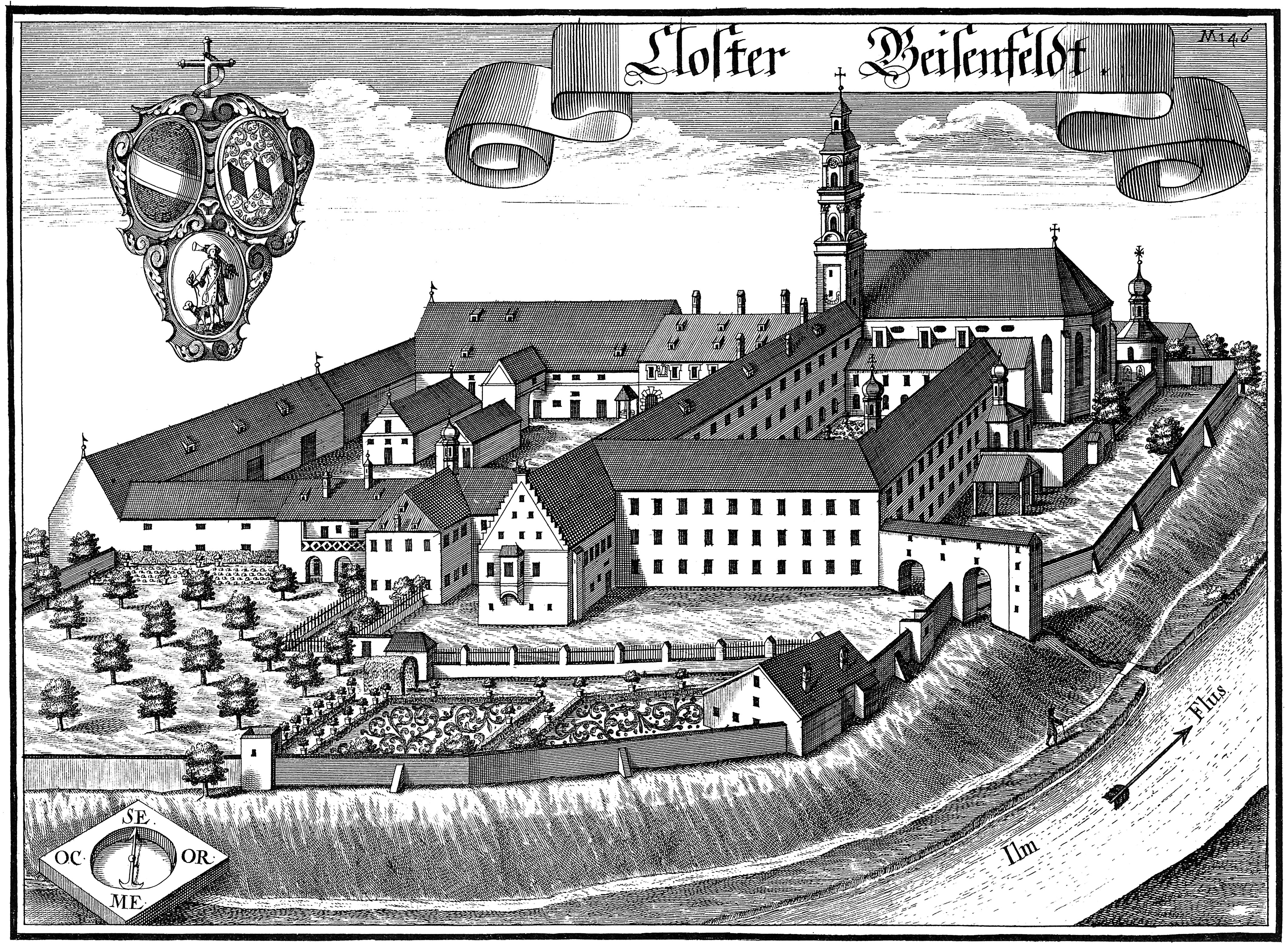
Geisenfeld Abbey around 1700 by Michael Wening

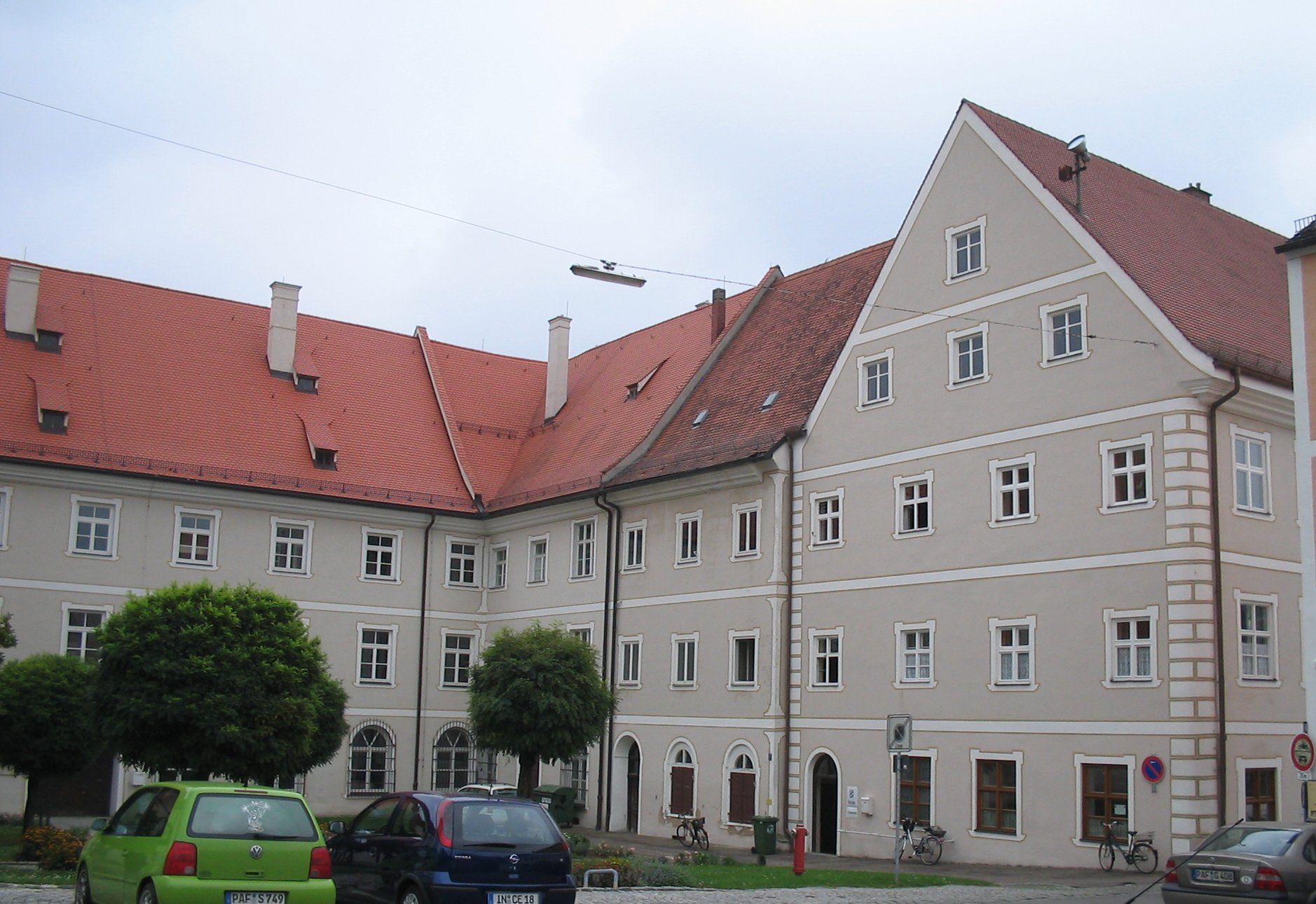
Abbey in September 2006

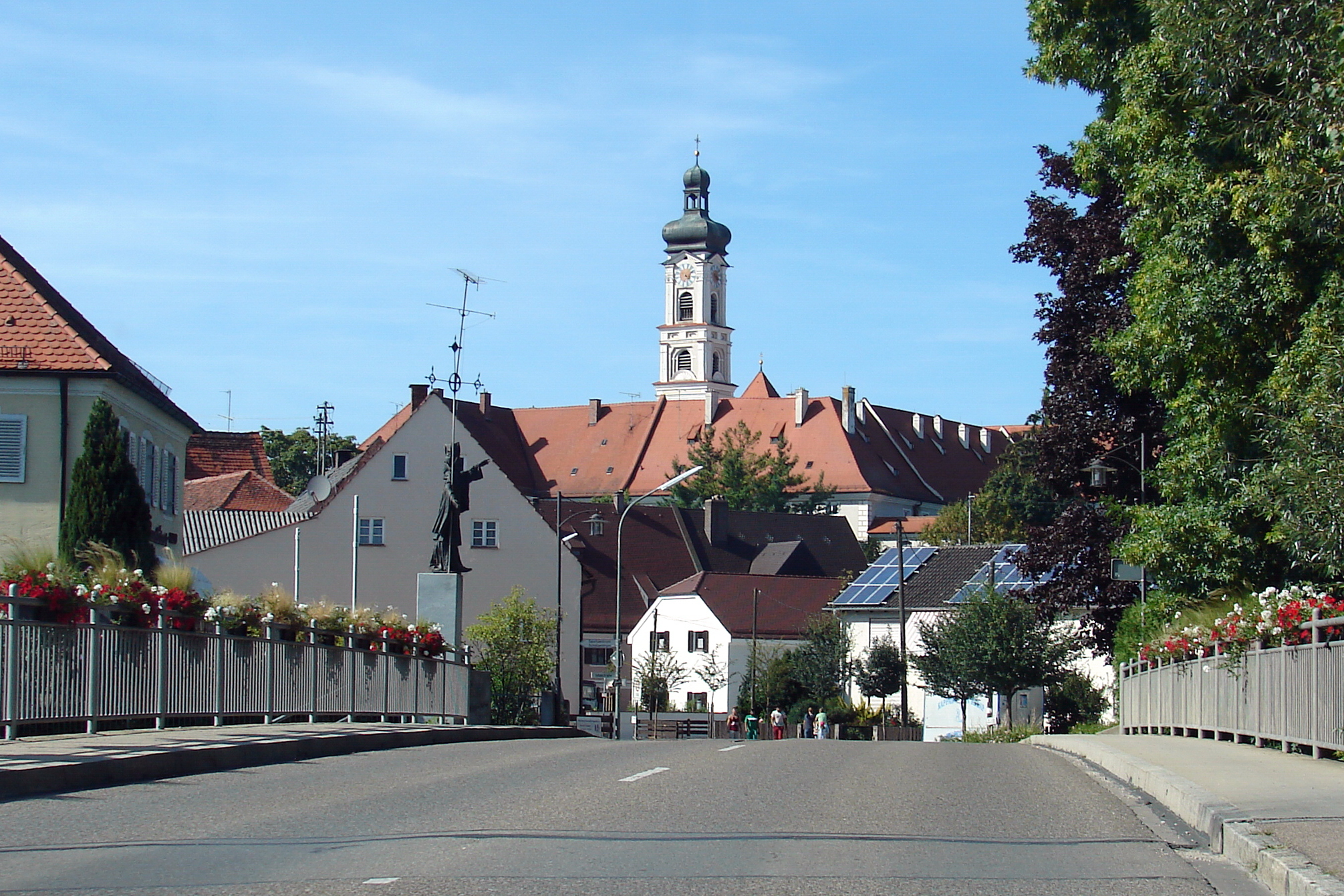
Abbey church
