= Reichertshausen =

- Municipality
- Coat of arms

- Location of Reichertshausen within Pfaffenhofen a.d.Ilm district
- Interactive map of Reichertshausen
- Location within Germany Location within Bavaria
- Coordinates: 48°28′N 11°31′E
- Country: Germany
- State: Bavaria
- Admin. region: Oberbayern
- District: Pfaffenhofen a.d.Ilm

Government
  - Mayor (2023–29): Benjamin Bertram-Pfister (SPD)

Area
  - Total: 23.64 km^{2} (9.13 sq mi)
- Elevation: 448 m (1,470 ft)

Population (2025-12-31)
  - Total: 5,142
  - Density: 217.5/km^{2} (563.4/sq mi)
- Time zone: UTC+01:00 (CET)
  - Summer (DST): UTC+02:00 (CEST)
- Postal codes: 85293
- Dialling codes: 08441, 08137
- Vehicle registration: PAF
- Website: www.reichertshausen.de

Reichertshausen (German pronunciation: [ʁaɪçɐtsˈhaʊzn̩]) is a municipality in the district of Pfaffenhofen in Bavaria in Germany and is near the A9 and between Munich and Ingolstadt.

== Geography ==
The Bundesstrasse 13 (B13) runs through Reichertshausen. Also the river Ilm, which gives the valley (Ilmtal) its name and is a tributary to the Abens, runs through the town.

=== Districts ===
- Bärnhausen
- Grafing
- Gründholm
- Gurnöbach
- Haunstetten
- Kreut
- Langwaid
- Lausham
- Salmading
- Oberpaindorf
- Paindorf
- Pischelsdorf
- Steinkirchen
