= Ilmmünster (Verwaltungsgemeinschaft) =

- Verwaltungsgemeinschaft
- Location of Ilmmünster within Pfaffenhofen district
- Interactive map of Ilmmünster
- Location within Germany Location within Bavaria
- Coordinates: 48°29′N 11°30′E
- Country: Germany
- State: Bavaria
- Admin. region: Upper Bavaria
- District: Pfaffenhofen
- Seat: Ilmmünster
- Subdivisions: 2 municipalities

Area
  - Total: 32.49 km^{2} (12.54 sq mi)

Population (2025-12-31)
  - Total: 4,332
  - Density: 133.3/km^{2} (345.3/sq mi)
- Time zone: UTC+01:00 (CET)
  - Summer (DST): UTC+02:00 (CEST)
- Website: www.vg-ilmmuenster.de

Ilmmünster is a Verwaltungsgemeinschaft (municipal association) in the district of Pfaffenhofen in Bavaria, Germany. Its seat is in Ilmmünster.

It consists of the following municipalities:

1. Hettenshausen
2. Ilmmünster
