= Rohrbach, Bavaria =

Rohrbach
- Municipality
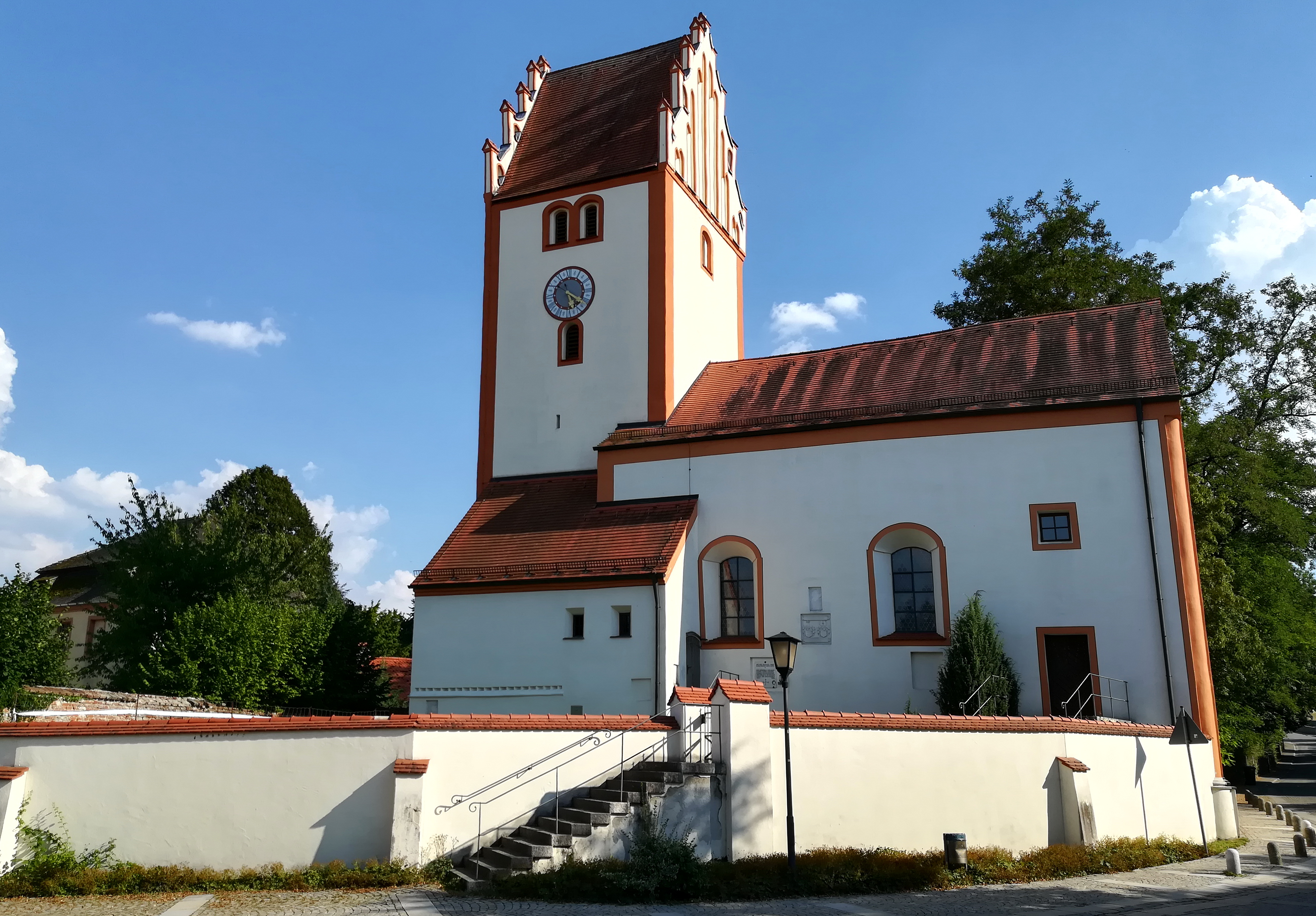
- Church of Saint John the Baptist

- Coat of arms

- Location of Rohrbach within Pfaffenhofen a.d.Ilm district
- Interactive map of Rohrbach
- Location within Germany Location within Bavaria
- Coordinates: 48°37′N 11°34′E
- Country: Germany
- State: Bavaria
- Admin. region: Oberbayern
- District: Pfaffenhofen a.d.Ilm

Government
  - Mayor (2020–26): Christian Keck (SPD)

Area
  - Total: 29.62 km^{2} (11.44 sq mi)
- Elevation: 396–440 m (1,299–1,444 ft)

Population (2025-12-31)
  - Total: 6,136
  - Density: 207.2/km^{2} (536.5/sq mi)
- Time zone: UTC+01:00 (CET)
  - Summer (DST): UTC+02:00 (CEST)
- Postal codes: 85296
- Dialling codes: 08442
- Vehicle registration: PAF
- Website: www.rohrbach-ilm.de

Rohrbach (German pronunciation: [ˈʁoːɐ̯bax]) is a municipality in the district of Pfaffenhofen in Bavaria in Germany.

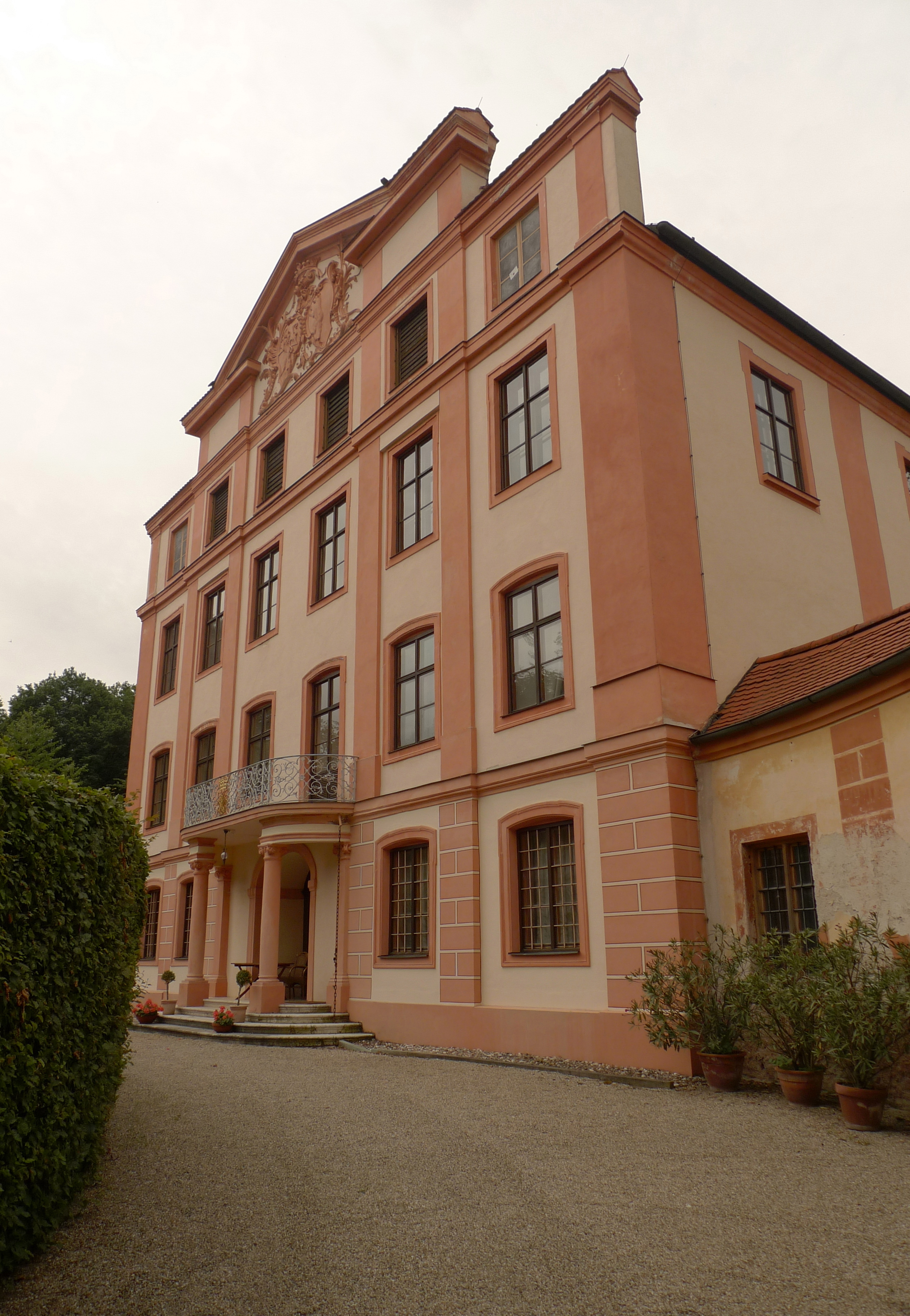
Rohrbach castle

== Personalities ==
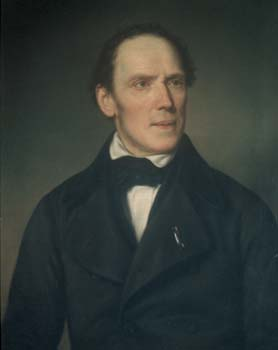
Johann Andreas Schmeller

- Johann Andreas Schmeller (1785-1852), Germanist and linguist; spent his childhood and youth in Rinnberg near Rohrbach.
- Raymond Wilson (born 1928), physicist, honorary citizen of Rohrbach
- Roman Inderst (born 1970), an economist

== See also ==
- Rohr, Pfaffenhofen
