= Geisenfeld =

- Town
- Coat of arms

- Location of Geisenfeld within Pfaffenhofen an der Ilm district
- Interactive map of Geisenfeld
- Location within Germany Location within Bavaria
- Coordinates: 48°40′N 11°36′E
- Country: Germany
- State: Bavaria
- Admin. region: Oberbayern
- District: Pfaffenhofen an der Ilm
- Municipal assoc.: Geisenfeld
- Subdivisions: 12 Ortsteile

Government
  - Mayor (2020–26): Paul Weber

Area
  - Total: 88.3 km^{2} (34.1 sq mi)
- Elevation: 385 m (1,263 ft)

Population (2025-12-31)
  - Total: 11,642
  - Density: 132/km^{2} (341/sq mi)
- Time zone: UTC+01:00 (CET)
  - Summer (DST): UTC+02:00 (CEST)
- Postal codes: 85290
- Dialling codes: 08452
- Vehicle registration: PAF
- Website: www.geisenfeld.de

Geisenfeld (German pronunciation: [ˈɡaɪzn̩ˌfɛlt]) is a town in the district of Pfaffenhofen, in Bavaria, Germany. It is situated on the river Ilm, 16 km (9.94 mi) southeast of Ingolstadt. The town grew up around Geisenfeld Abbey, a convent founded in 1037.

== Subdivisions ==
Geisenfeld has twelve districts, formerly independent municipalities:

- Engelbrechtsmünster
- Gaden including Wasenstadt and Furthof
- Geisenfeld
- Geisenfeldwinden
- Ilmendorf including Einberg
- Nötting
- Parleiten including Eichelberg, Holzleiten and Scheuerhof
- Rottenegg including Hornlohe, Moosmühle and Brunn
- Schillwitzried including Schillwitzhausen, Schafhof and Gießübel
- Untermettenbach including Obermettenbach and Ziegelstadel
- Unterpindhart including Kolmhof, Untereulenthal and Obereulenthal
- Zell including Ainau, Ritterswörth, Unterzell and Oberzell

== Sons and daughters of the town ==
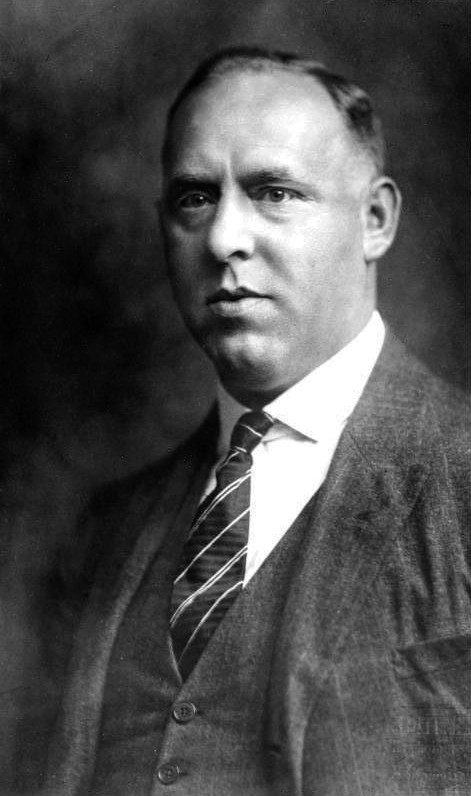
Gregor Strasser 1928

- Gregor Strasser (1892-1934), national socialist politician, publisher and participant in Hitler-Ludendorff-Putsch
