= Hettenshausen =

- Municipality
- Coat of arms

- Location of Hettenshausen within Pfaffenhofen a.d.Ilm district
- Interactive map of Hettenshausen
- Location within Germany Location within Bavaria
- Coordinates: 48°30′N 11°30′E
- Country: Germany
- State: Bavaria
- Admin. region: Oberbayern
- District: Pfaffenhofen a.d.Ilm
- Municipal assoc.: Ilmmünster

Government
  - Mayor (2020–26): Wolfgang Hagl

Area
  - Total: 18.6 km^{2} (7.2 sq mi)
- Elevation: 435 m (1,427 ft)

Population (2025-12-31)
  - Total: 2,139
  - Density: 115/km^{2} (298/sq mi)
- Time zone: UTC+01:00 (CET)
  - Summer (DST): UTC+02:00 (CEST)
- Postal codes: 85276
- Dialling codes: 08441
- Vehicle registration: PAF

Hettenshausen (German pronunciation: [hɛtn̩sˈhaʊzn̩]) is a municipality in the district of Pfaffenhofen in Bavaria in Germany.
