= Münchsmünster =

- Municipality
- Coat of arms

- Location of Münchsmünster within Pfaffenhofen a.d.Ilm district
- Interactive map of Münchsmünster
- Location within Germany Location within Bavaria
- Coordinates: 48°45′51″N 11°41′28″E
- Country: Germany
- State: Bavaria
- Admin. region: Oberbayern
- District: Pfaffenhofen a.d.Ilm

Government
  - Mayor (2020–26): Andreas Meyer

Area
  - Total: 16.21 km^{2} (6.26 sq mi)
- Elevation: 357 m (1,171 ft)

Population (2025-12-31)
  - Total: 3,264
  - Density: 201.4/km^{2} (521.5/sq mi)
- Time zone: UTC+01:00 (CET)
  - Summer (DST): UTC+02:00 (CEST)
- Postal codes: 85126
- Dialling codes: 08402
- Vehicle registration: PAF
- Website: www.muenchsmuenster.de

Münchsmünster (German pronunciation: [ˈmʏnçsˌmʏnstɐ]) is a municipality in the district of Pfaffenhofen in Bavaria in Germany. The town grew up around the former Münchsmünster Abbey, which was demolished around 1817 and its stones used for construction of houses.

== Gallery ==
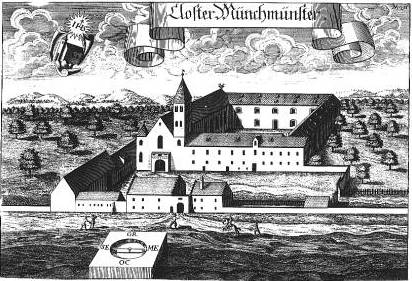
Kloster Muenchsmuenster (1701) by Michael Wening

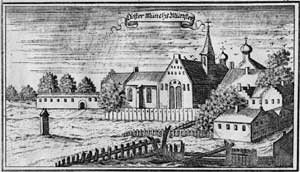
Copperplate engraving of the abbey by Anton Wilhelm Ertl, 1687

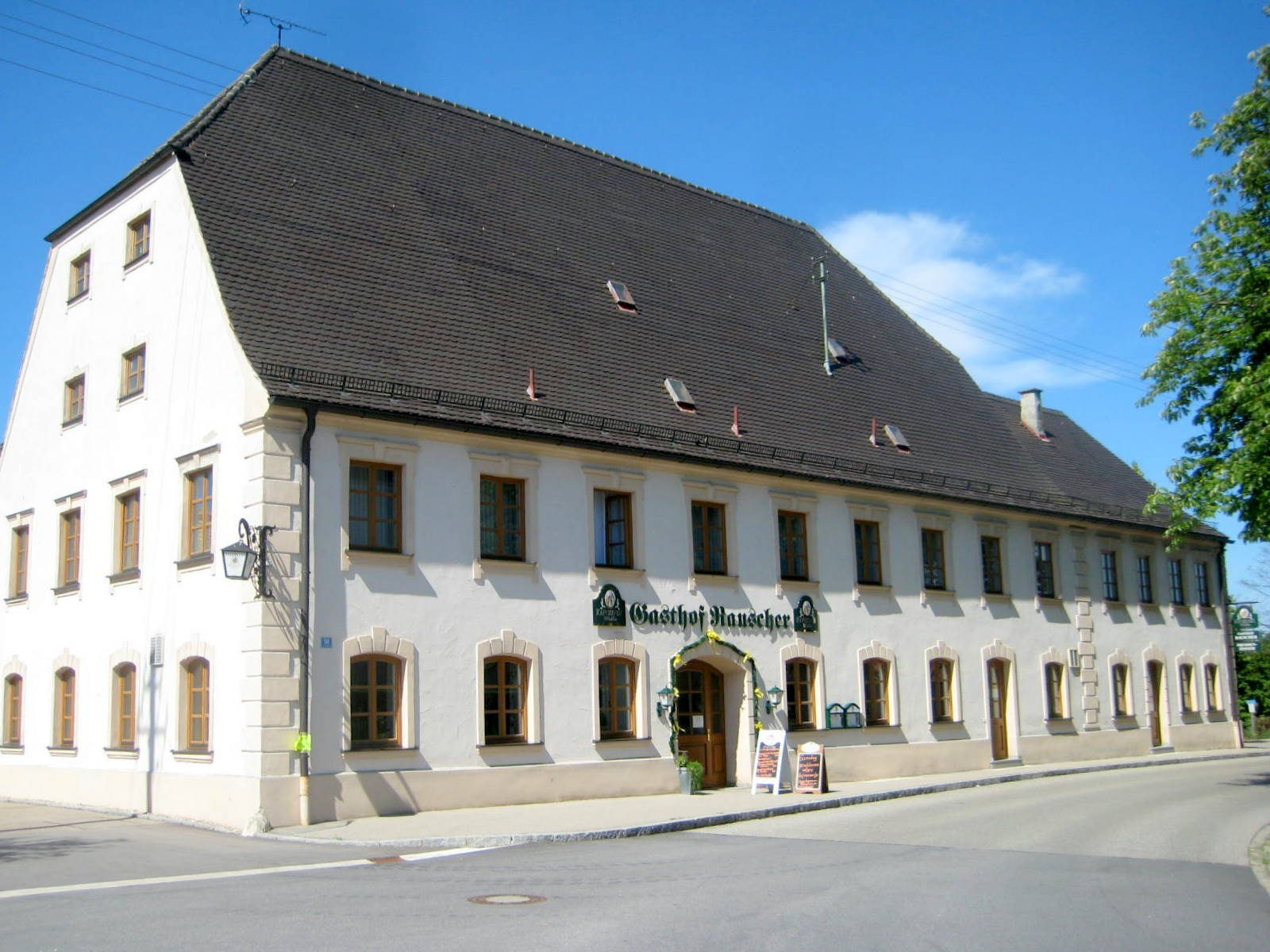
Rauscher guest house

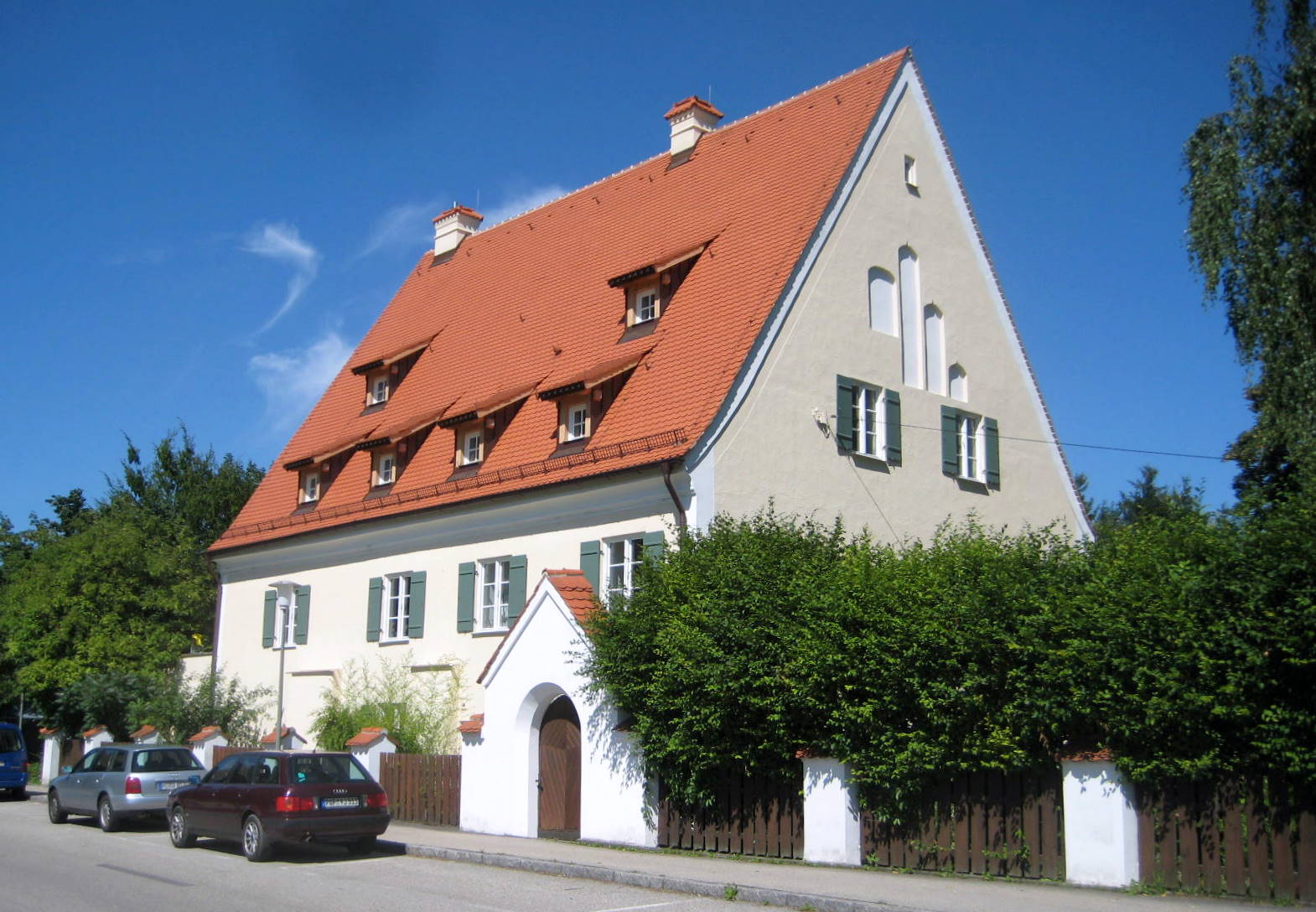
Forest house

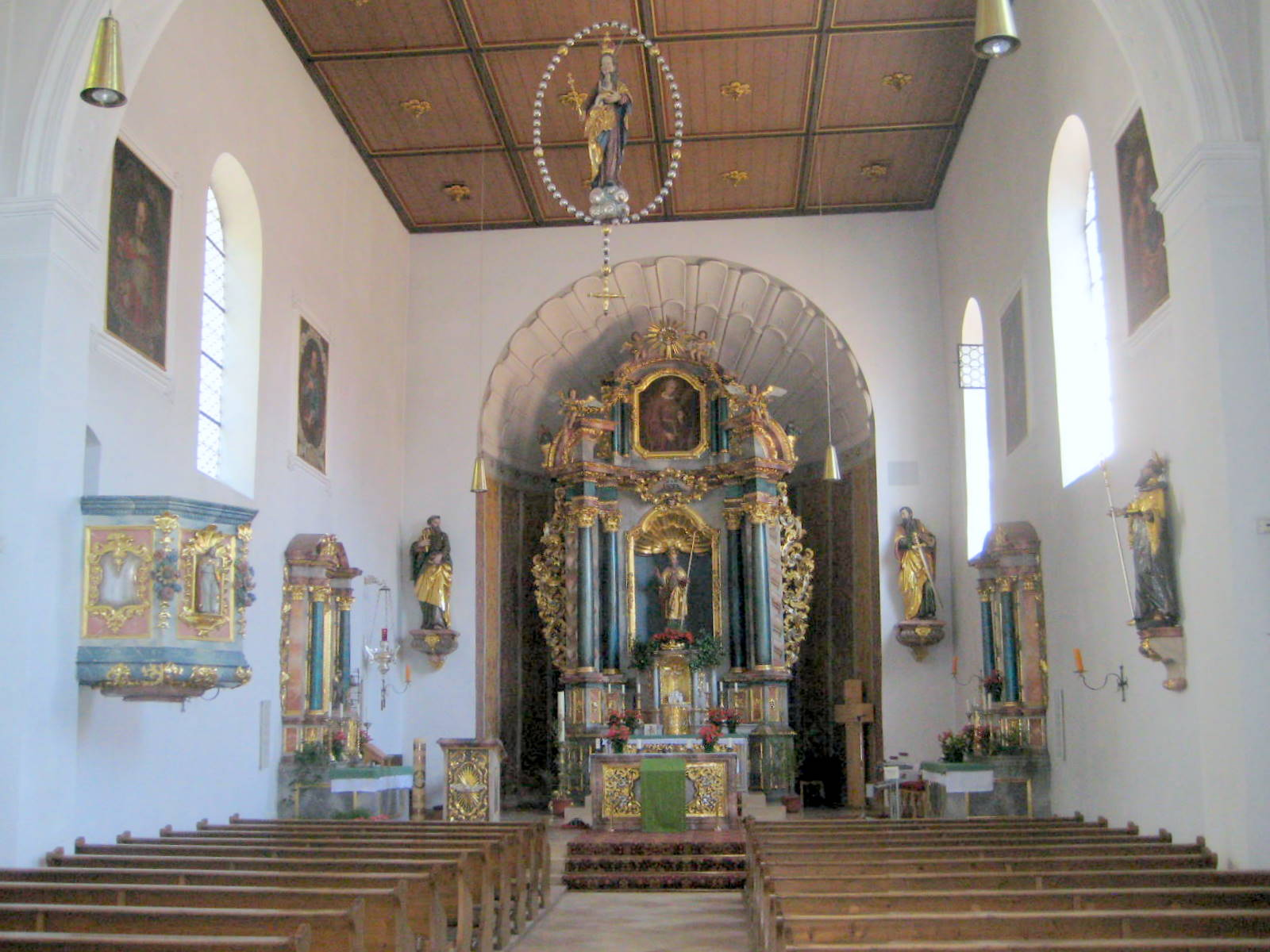
Church interior

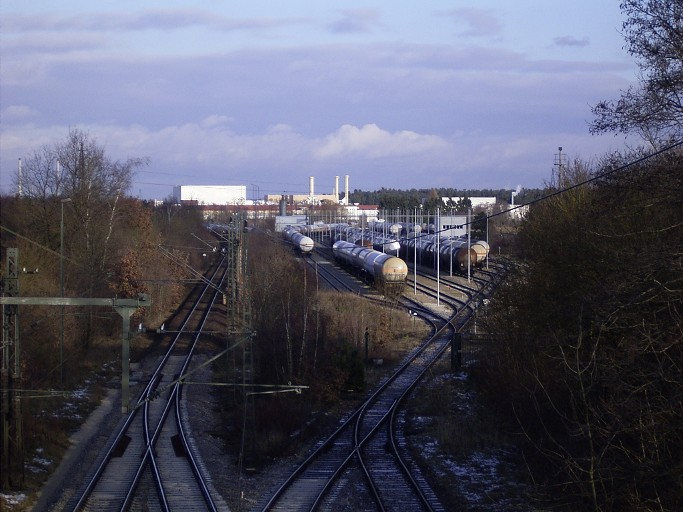
Gueterbahnhof Industrial park
