= Hohenwart =

- Municipality
- Coat of arms

- Location of Hohenwart within Pfaffenhofen a.d.Ilm district
- Interactive map of Hohenwart
- Location within Germany Location within Bavaria
- Coordinates: 48°36′N 11°23′E
- Country: Germany
- State: Bavaria
- Admin. region: Oberbayern
- District: Pfaffenhofen a.d.Ilm

Government
  - Mayor (2020–26): Jürgen Haindl (FW)

Area
  - Total: 52.22 km^{2} (20.16 sq mi)
- Elevation: 395 m (1,296 ft)

Population (2025-12-31)
  - Total: 4,886
  - Density: 93.57/km^{2} (242.3/sq mi)
- Time zone: UTC+01:00 (CET)
  - Summer (DST): UTC+02:00 (CEST)
- Postal codes: 86558
- Dialling codes: 08443
- Vehicle registration: PAF
- Website: www.markt-hohenwart.de

Hohenwart (German pronunciation: [ˈhoːənvaʁt]) is a municipality in the district of Pfaffenhofen in Bavaria in Germany.
