= Geisenfeld (Verwaltungsgemeinschaft) =

- Verwaltungsgemeinschaft
- Location of Geisenfeld within Pfaffenhofen district
- Interactive map of Geisenfeld
- Location within Germany Location within Bavaria
- Coordinates: 48°41′N 11°37′E
- Country: Germany
- State: Bavaria
- Admin. region: Upper Bavaria
- District: Pfaffenhofen
- Seat: Geisenfeld
- Subdivisions: 2 municipalities

Area
  - Total: 95.8 km^{2} (37.0 sq mi)

Population (2025-12-31)
  - Total: 13,455
  - Density: 140/km^{2} (364/sq mi)
- Time zone: UTC+01:00 (CET)
  - Summer (DST): UTC+02:00 (CEST)
- Website: www.geisenfeld.de

Geisenfeld is a Verwaltungsgemeinschaft (municipal association) in the district of Pfaffenhofen in Bavaria, Germany. Its seat is in Geisenfeld.

It consists of the following municipalities:

1. Ernsgaden
2. Geisenfeld
