= Pörnbach =

- Municipality
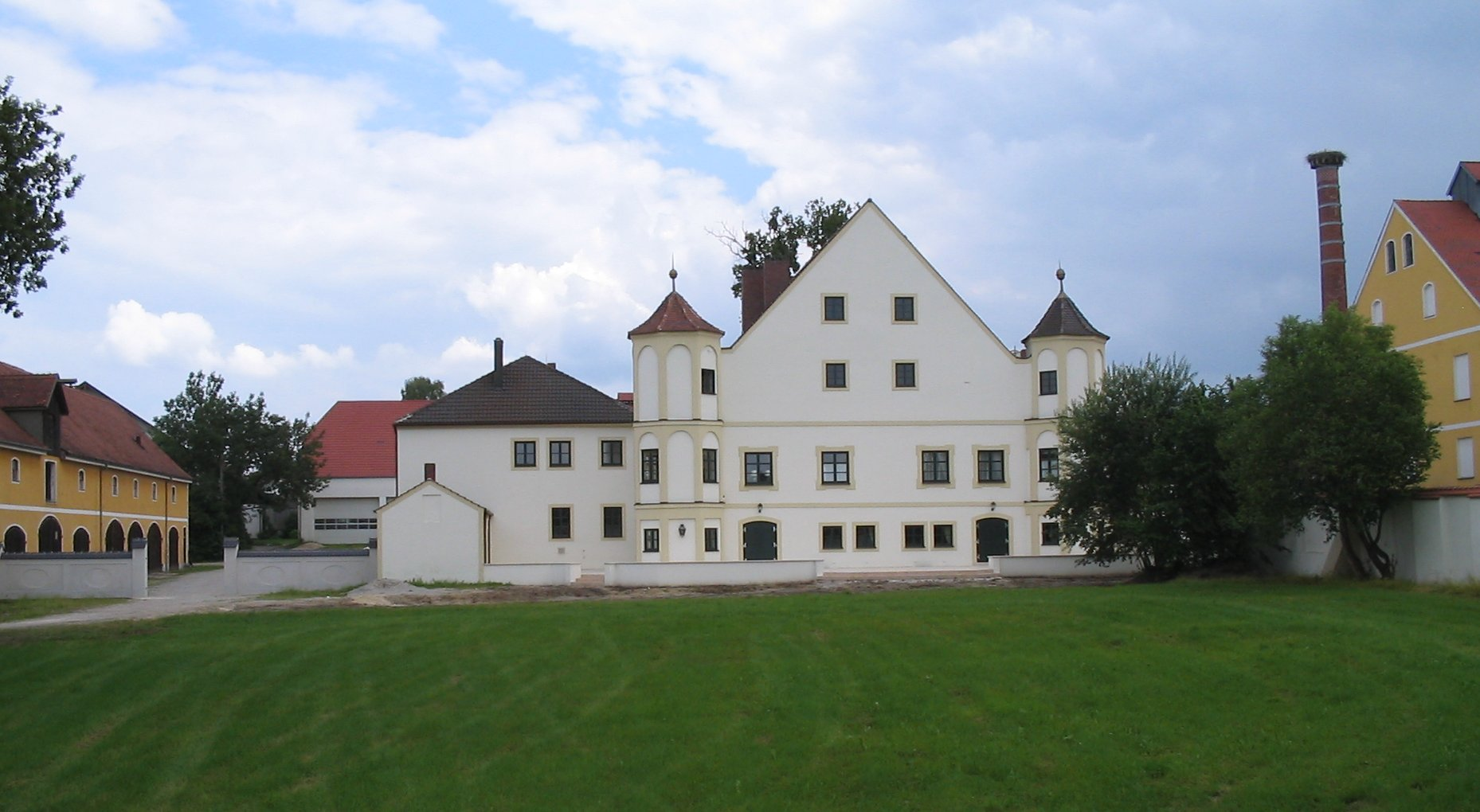
- Pörnbach Castle

- Flag Coat of arms

- Location of Pörnbach within Pfaffenhofen a.d.Ilm district
- Interactive map of Pörnbach
- Location within Germany Location within Bavaria
- Coordinates: 48°37′N 11°28′E
- Country: Germany
- State: Bavaria
- Admin. region: Oberbayern
- District: Pfaffenhofen a.d.Ilm
- Municipal assoc.: Reichertshofen

Government
  - Mayor (2020–26): Helmut Bergwinkel

Area
  - Total: 22.63 km^{2} (8.74 sq mi)
- Elevation: 396 m (1,299 ft)

Population (2025-12-31)
  - Total: 2,215
  - Density: 97.88/km^{2} (253.5/sq mi)
- Time zone: UTC+01:00 (CET)
  - Summer (DST): UTC+02:00 (CEST)
- Postal codes: 85309
- Dialling codes: 08446
- Vehicle registration: PAF
- Website: www.poernbach.de

Pörnbach (German pronunciation: [ˈpœʁnˌbax]) is a municipality in the district of Pfaffenhofen in Bavaria in Germany.
