= Pfaffenhofen (district) =

Coordinates: 48°30′N 11°30′E

- District
- Flag Coat of arms
- Country: Germany
- State: Bavaria
- Adm. region: Upper Bavaria
- Capital: Pfaffenhofen an der Ilm

Government
  - District admin.: Albert Gürtner (FW)

Area
  - Total: 760 km^{2} (290 sq mi)

Population (31 December 2025)
  - Total: 131,079
  - Density: 170/km^{2} (450/sq mi)
- Time zone: UTC+01:00 (CET)
  - Summer (DST): UTC+02:00 (CEST)
- Vehicle registration: PAF
- Website: landkreis-pfaffenhofen.de

Pfaffenhofen (German: [pfafn̩ˈhoːfn̩]) is a Landkreis (district) in Bavaria, Germany. It is bounded by (from the south and clockwise) the districts of Eichstätt, Kelheim, Freising, Dachau and Neuburg-Schrobenhausen, and the city of Ingolstadt.

== History ==
In early medieval times the region was partially property of the powerful monasteries of Ilmmünster and Münchsmünster, and partially divided into tiny secular states. One of those states was the county of Scheyern. The counts were ancestors of the Wittelsbach family, who in 1180 became rulers of Bavaria. From that time on the region was a part of Bavaria.

The district of Pfaffenhofen was established in 1972 by merging several former districts.

== Geography ==
The district is located in the Hallertau Plains between the Isar and Danube rivers. The Danube crosses the northernmost part of the district.

== Coat of arms ==
The coat of arms displays:

- the white and blue lozenges of Bavaria
- a cross symbolising the monastery of Scheyern
- a branch of hops

== Towns and municipalities ==
Clickable map of towns and municipalities in the district

Towns

1. Pfaffenhofen an der Ilm
2. Vohburg

Märkte

1. Hohenwart
2. Manching
3. Wolnzach

Municipalities

1. Baar-Ebenhausen
2. Gerolsbach
3. Jetzendorf
4. Münchsmünster
5. Reichertshausen
6. Rohrbach
7. Scheyern
8. Schweitenkirchen

Verwaltungsgemeinschaften
1. Geisenfeld; 1. Ernsgaden; 2. Geisenfeld^{1,2}	2. Ilmmünster; 1. Hettenshausen; 2. Ilmmünster^{1}	3. Reichertshofen; 1. Pörnbach; 2. Reichertshofen^{1,3}
^{1}seat of the Verwaltungsgemeinschaft; ^{2}town; ^{3}Markt

== International cooperation ==
These are the official sister cities

	Country	City	County / District / Region / State
(Serbia)	Serbia	Valjevo	Kolubara District
