= Reichertshofen (Verwaltungsgemeinschaft) =

- Verwaltungsgemeinschaft
- Location of Reichertshofen within Pfaffenhofen district
- Interactive map of Reichertshofen
- Location within Germany Location within Bavaria
- Coordinates: 48°40′N 11°28′E
- Country: Germany
- State: Bavaria
- Admin. region: Upper Bavaria
- District: Pfaffenhofen
- Seat: Reichertshofen
- Subdivisions: 2 municipalities

Area
  - Total: 59.52 km^{2} (22.98 sq mi)

Population (2025-12-31)
  - Total: 10,349
  - Density: 173.9/km^{2} (450.3/sq mi)
- Time zone: UTC+01:00 (CET)
  - Summer (DST): UTC+02:00 (CEST)
- Website: www.vg-reichertshofen.de

Reichertshofen is a Verwaltungsgemeinschaft (municipal association) in the district of Pfaffenhofen in Bavaria, Germany. Its seat is in Reichertshofen.

It consists of the following municipalities:

1. Pörnbach
2. Reichertshofen
