= Willi Vogl =

German composer

Willi Vogl (born 3 December 1961) is a German composer, clarinetist and college scholar.

== Life ==
Vogl was born in Reichertshofen and grew up in Karlskron. From 1983 to 1989 he studied musical composition with Alfred Koerppen and clarinette with Hans Deinzer at the Hochschule für Musik und Theater Hannover. Afterwards he studied composition for two years with Heinz Winbeck at the Hochschule für Musik Würzburg.

From 1992 to 2008 he worked as a teacher for composition, music theory, ear training, clarinette and chamber music at Latina (school). In addition, he held teaching positions at the Evangelical University of Church Music Halle and at the Music Pedagogical Institute of the Martin-Luther-University Halle-Wittenberg. In 2004 he was Composer in Residence at the International Merz Society. Since 2008 Vogl has been active as a freelance composer. Further focal points of his work are the conception and management of musical-literary projects and composition competitions as well as teaching activities in composition and chamber music courses in Germany and abroad. So far he has composed more than 70 works, which have been performed by the Staatskapelle Halle, the Nuremberg Symphony Orchestra, the Georgisches Kammerorchester Ingolstadt, the Ensemble Sortisatio and the Sächsisches Vocalensemble.

== Work ==
Ballet music

- Der Kessel der Weisheit (1988/1989)

Concerts and orchestral music

- Schubert-Landschaft, Concerto for clarinet and orchestra (1998)
- In dieser Zeit, Intrada for orchestra (2007)
- Clarus Clarissimae (2009)
- Mahlers Dämonen for orchestra (2010)
- mp3 player - Visualized Symphony for Moving Picture Experts Group, Audio Layer III (2012)

Symphonic brass band music

- Madeira, Ouverture (2008)
- heim.at.raum (2009)
- Reflexion eines Tautropfens (2008)
- Gelobtes Land (2009)

Vocal symphony

- Farbspiegel, cycle for soprano and orchestra after poems by Georg Trakl (1987)
- Psalm cantata after texts by Martin Luther (1986)
- Sine Pietate AHF, choral cantata after a text by Johann Matthesius (1998)
- Ich bin der Weinstock - Cantata for solo quartet, choir and orchestra (2011)
- Damit wir klug werden - Cantata for soprano solo, 3-part women's choir and orchestra (2014)
- Gott.Fried - Oratorio after texts by Martin Luther and Willi Vogl (2015)

Choir

- Scheene neie Musik - Ein Zwiefacher for mixed choir a cappella (2003)
- Oh Danny Boy - Fantasy for mixed choir, solos and flute (2006)
- Psalm 47 for 3-part girls' or women's choir and organ (2009)
- Walzer mit Nietzsche for choir SATB and piano (2010)
- Angel for 4-6 voice choir a cappella and mezzo-soprano solo after texts by William Shakespeare, Dante Alighieri and Arthur Rimbaud (2011)
- Wir machen und sind - Poetic Commentary on Psalm 23 - for 3-part girls' or women's choir and organ (2013)
- Move your Feeling! for 1-2 part upper voice choir and piano (2013)

Vocal chamber music

- Four cabaret songs for voice and piano based on texts by Friedhelm Kändler (1990/1991)
- Neue Seele, Three songs for soprano and piano based on texts by Andrea Kießling (2011)

Chamber music for 1 instrument

- Judicium Paridis for oboe solo (1980/Rev.1990)
- Palindrome for piano solo (1993) Repetition-Centre-Cycle
- Zehndrum for piano solo (1996)
- Final Apple for clarinet solo (2003)
- Song of the Warbler for clarinet solo (2009)
- Metamorphosis to the night for clarinet solo (2009)
- Tango consolationis (Tango of consolation) for organ solo (2012)
- Dohoam - Hymns in the moss for organ solo (2016)
- Yodel - 3 greetings for basset clarinet solo / basset horn solo / bass clarinet solo (2017)

Chamber Music for 2 Instruments

- Cell division for 2 clarinets (1986/1987) Music with movement, position and colour analogies
- Vocalise for clarinet and piano (1994)
- Parallels for clarinet and piano (1996)
- Arbor - Der Gesang der Bäume, for clarinet and piano (1999)
- Irrlicht.white-blue for violin and piano (2006)
- Oktoberfest for clarinet and tuba (2007)
- Dark figures for bass clarinet in Bb and bass tuba in F (2007)

Chamber Music for 3 Instruments

- -Drio- for Vl, Vc, Klav (1992/1993)
- Fünf Türme in two times for transverse flute, baroque cello and harpsichord (1998)
- Nebel fliehn for 3 basset horns (2011)

Chamber Music for 4 Instruments

- Lichtbrechung, quartet for Vl, Kl, Vc, Piano (1989)
- Lebendige Forellensauce überlaut; Violet Rumann to the Kastens Kurhaus Luisenhof! Quartet for Fl, Kl, Schlagw, piano (1991)
- String Quartet I (1991)
- Grüne Inseln, Quartet for oboe, bassoon, viola and guitar (2000)
- Alpenmechanik for 3 cellos and double bass (2009)
- Sonnen glühn for 1 clarinet and 3 basset horns (2011)
- Party for 4 clarinets, body percussion and speaking syllables (2013)

Chamber music for 5 and more instruments

- Geburtstag (1996) vocals for 5 clarinets (Eb, 3B, bass) and tubular bells
- Music for wind quintet (1996) (Fl, Ob, Klar, Hr, Fg)
- Intarsien zwischen fünf Türmen (2001) (Fl, Ob, Fg, Vl, Vla, Vc)
- Hall.markt 2006 - 5 fanfares for 3 trumpets, 3 trombones, tuba and percussion
- Ars@Domus.Dei - music for organ and brass sextet (2009)
- Alles Walzer (2010) - miniature for Fl, Kl, Fg, Schlagw, Vl, Va, Vc
- 20 Compositions by Willi Vogl on the German National Library

== Writings ==
- Tradition und Transformation. Historische Fundstücke in der Musik Olivier Messiaens. In Franziska Seils (ed.): Das Licht des Himmels und der Brunnen der Geschichte. Festschrift Volker Bräutigam zum 65. Geburtstag am 23. Mai 2004. Ortus-Musikverlag, Beeskow 2004, ISBN 3-937788-00-X, pp. 81–115.

== Literature ==
- Vogl, Willi. In Wilfried W. Bruchhäuser: Komponisten der Gegenwart im Deutschen Komponisten-Interessenverband. Ein Handbuch. 4th edition, Deutscher Komponisten-Interessenverband, Berlin 1995, ISBN 3-55561-410-X, p. 1321.
