= Reichertshofen =

- Municipality
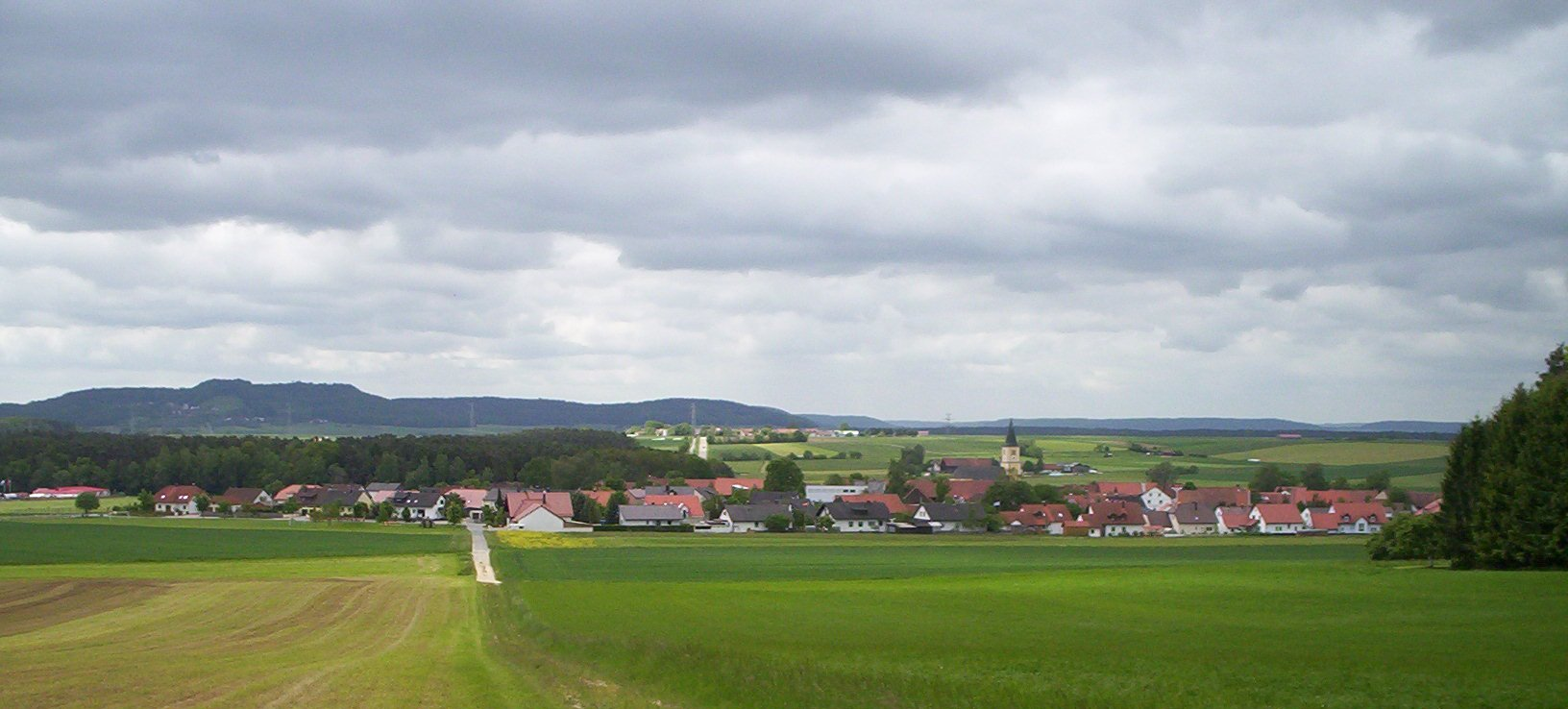
- View towards Reichertshofen

- Coat of arms
- Interactive map of Reichertshofen
- Location within Germany Location within Bavaria
- Coordinates: 48°40′N 11°28′E
- Country: Germany
- State: Bavaria
- Admin. region: Oberbayern
- District: Pfaffenhofen a.d.Ilm
- Municipal assoc.: Reichertshofen

Government
  - Mayor (2020–26): Michael Franken

Area
  - Total: 36.89 km^{2} (14.24 sq mi)
- Elevation: 381 m (1,250 ft)

Population (2025-12-31)
  - Total: 8,134
  - Density: 220.5/km^{2} (571.1/sq mi)
- Time zone: UTC+01:00 (CET)
  - Summer (DST): UTC+02:00 (CEST)
- Postal codes: 85084
- Dialling codes: 08453
- Vehicle registration: PAF
- Website: www.reichertshofen.de

Reichertshofen (German pronunciation: [ʁaɪçɐtsˈhoːfn̩]) is a market town and municipality in the district of Pfaffenhofen in Bavaria in Germany

The composer Willi Vogl was born in the city (1965)
