= Ilmmünster Abbey =

Former abbey in Bavaria, Germany

- Ilmmünster Stiftskirche
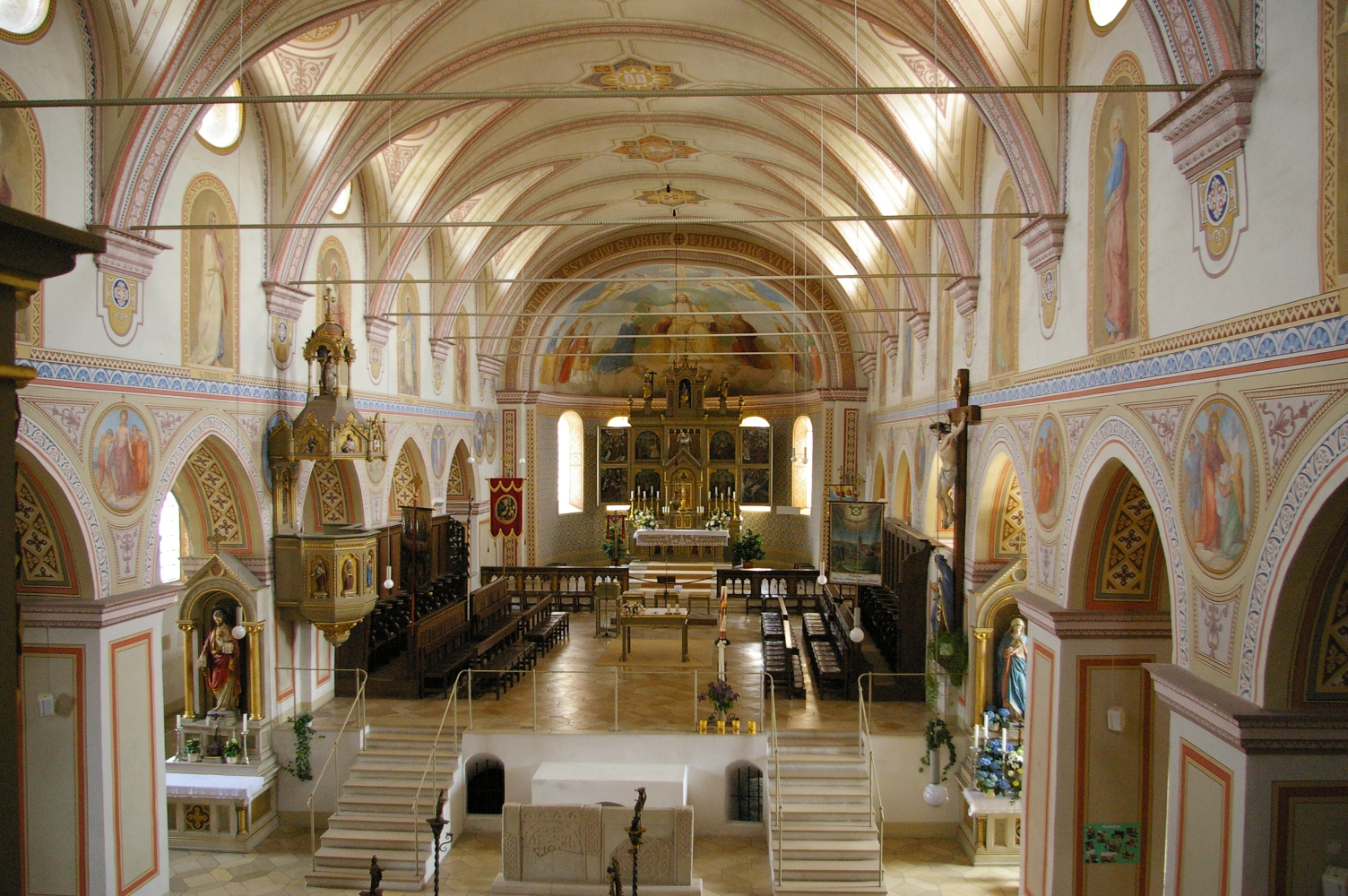

- Location within Germany

Religion
- Affiliation: Catholic
- Sect: Benedictines

Location
- Country: Germany
- Coordinates: 48°29′15″N 11°30′07″E

Architecture
- Founder: 762

Ilmmünster Abbey (German: Kloster Ilmmünster or Stift Ilmmünster) was a collegiate foundation (Kollegiatstift) of canons, formerly a Benedictine monastery, in Ilmmünster, Bavaria, Germany. The church continues in use as a parish church.

== History ==
The Benedictine monastery was founded in about 762 by the brothers Adalbert and Otker, members of the Huosi, an ancient Bavarian noble family, and their nephew Eio (or Uto), as a daughter house of Tegernsee Abbey, also founded by Adalbert and Otker. Eio is reckoned as Ilmmünster's first abbot. He obtained for the new monastery the relics of Saint Arsatius, to whom the monastery was dedicated. Archaeological remains indicate that the buildings were substantial, but little is known of the monastery otherwise. It may have continued unnoted by the written record, or even been extinguished entirely, perhaps as early as about 925 in the secularisations of Arnulf the Wicked.

In 1060 under Margrave Ernst a collegiate foundation (Kollegiatstift) of canons was set up here. If any trace of the earlier monastery or monastic community remained by that time, the new foundation replaced it. Besides ministering to several parishes, the new foundation ran a school, which gained a high reputation. Among its pupils was Conradin, the last of the Hohenstaufen kings. Distinguished canons included Albert von March, Imperial chancellor, and Nicholas of Cusa, cardinal and Papal legate.

In 1493, Albert V, Duke of Bavaria, despite strong local opposition, transferred the canons and the relics of Saint Arsatius, as well as those of Schliersee with their relics of Saint Sixtus, to increase the standing of his newly-created collegiate foundation Zu Unserer Lieben Frau at the Frauenkirche in Munich. The canons' church of Saint Arsatius, deprived of its relics, lost its function as a centre of pilgrimage, and became a parish church. Such property and assets as remained were sold off in 1802 during the secularisation of Bavaria, but the impressive church remains.

== Sources ==
- Backmund, Norbert: Die Kollegiat- und Kanonissenstifte in Bayern, Windberg 1973, pp. 71f.;
- Bauerreiß, Romuald: "Die Stifter von Ilmmünster", in: Studien und Mitteilungen zur Geschichte des Benediktinerordens und seiner Zweige 60 (1946), pp. 32–37;
- Bosl, Karl (ed.): Handbuch der historischen Stätten Deutschlands Bd. 7 (Bayern), Stuttgart 1961, pp. 305f.;
- Fastlinger Max: Die wirtschaftliche Bedeutung der bayerischen Klöster in der Zeit der Agilulfinger, Freiburg i. Br. 1903, pp. 162f.;
- Hemmerle, Josef: Die Benediktinerklöster in Bayern (= Germania Benedictina II: Bayern), München 1970, pp. 119f.;
- Pfister, Peter: Das Kollegiatstift Ilmmünster, Pfaffenhofen 1981;
- Pfister, Peter: Ilmmünster, Regensburg 1995;
- Sage, Walter: Ausgrabungen in der Pfarr- und ehemaligen Stiftskirche St. Arsatius zu Ilmmünster, Landkreis Pfaffenhofen, in: Beiträge zur Altbayerischen Kirchengeschichte 31 (1977), S. 165-174.
