= Ernsgaden =

- Municipality
- Coat of arms

- Location of Ernsgaden within Pfaffenhofen a.d.Ilm district
- Interactive map of Ernsgaden
- Location within Germany Location within Bavaria
- Coordinates: 48°44′N 11°35′E
- Country: Germany
- State: Bavaria
- Admin. region: Oberbayern
- District: Pfaffenhofen a.d.Ilm
- Municipal assoc.: Geisenfeld

Government
  - Mayor (2020–26): Hubert Attenberger (CSU)

Area
  - Total: 7.41 km^{2} (2.86 sq mi)
- Elevation: 316 m (1,037 ft)

Population (2025-12-31)
  - Total: 1,813
  - Density: 245/km^{2} (634/sq mi)
- Time zone: UTC+01:00 (CET)
  - Summer (DST): UTC+02:00 (CEST)
- Postal codes: 85119
- Dialling codes: 08452
- Vehicle registration: PAF
- Website: www.ernsgaden.de

Ernsgaden is a municipality in the district of Pfaffenhofen in Bavaria in Germany.
