= Baar-Ebenhausen =

- Municipality
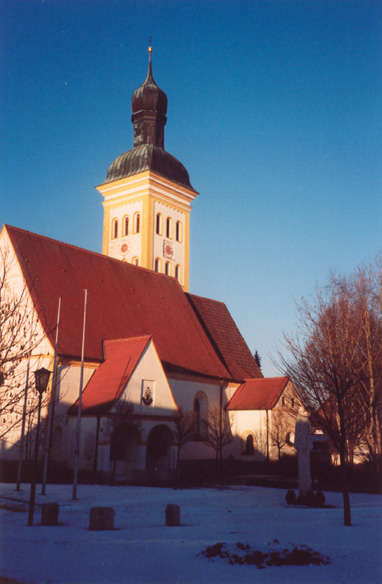
- Church in Baar-Ebenhausen

- Coat of arms

- Location of Baar-Ebenhausen within Pfaffenhofen an der Ilm district
- Interactive map of Baar-Ebenhausen
- Location within Germany Location within Bavaria
- Coordinates: 48°40′N 11°26′E
- Country: Germany
- State: Bavaria
- Admin. region: Oberbayern
- District: Pfaffenhofen an der Ilm
- Subdivisions: 3 Ortsteile

Government
  - Mayor (2020–26): Ludwig Wayand (CSU)

Area
  - Total: 14.80 km^{2} (5.71 sq mi)
- Elevation: 374 m (1,227 ft)

Population (2025-12-31)
  - Total: 5,554
  - Density: 375.3/km^{2} (971.9/sq mi)
- Time zone: UTC+01:00 (CET)
  - Summer (DST): UTC+02:00 (CEST)
- Postal codes: 85107
- Dialling codes: 08453
- Vehicle registration: PAF
- Website: www.baar-ebenhausen.de

Baar-Ebenhausen (German pronunciation: [ˌbaːɐ̯ʔeːbm̩ˈhaʊzn̩]) is a municipality in the district of Pfaffenhofen in Bavaria in Germany.
