= Arsatius =

Italian Roman Catholic saint

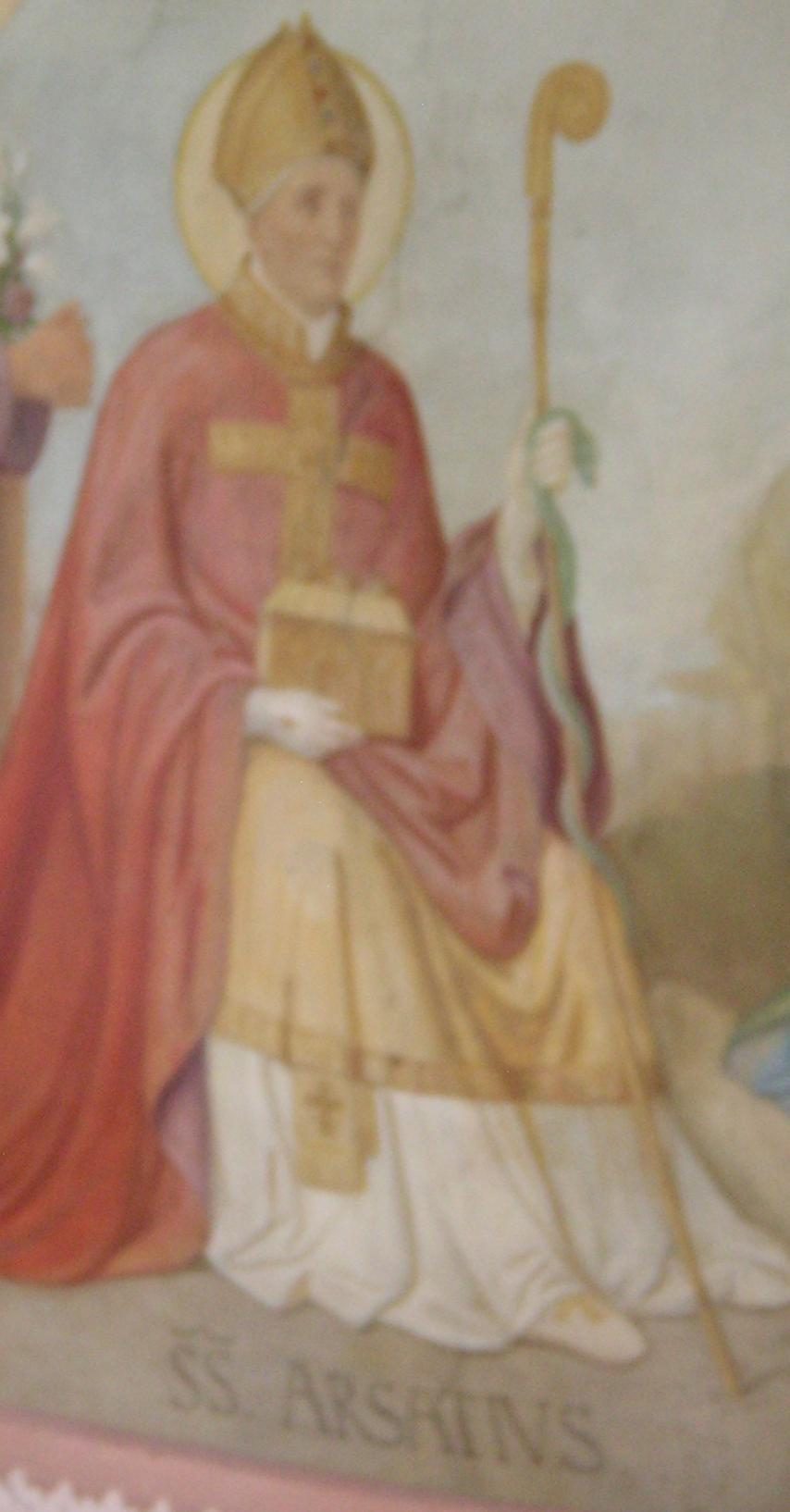
- Venerated in: Roman Catholic Church
- Feast: 12 November

Saint Arsatius or Arsacius is a saint of whose life virtually nothing is known. He is said to have been a bishop of Milan, who lived either around 400 or in the 6th century, and possibly a martyr, but there is no evidence. Because of the traditional connection with Milan, he is further supposed to have been a disciple of Saint Ambrose, who was also Bishop of Milan, but there is no evidence of this either.

His relics were brought in 766 from Rome to Ilmmünster Monastery where a cultus grew up around them and where the well-known Arsatius-Basilika is still dedicated to him. They were moved to Munich in 1495, but returned to Ilmmünster in 1846. His feast day is 12 November.
