= Gerolsbach =

- Municipality
- Coat of arms

- Location of Gerolsbach within Pfaffenhofen an der Ilm district
- Interactive map of Gerolsbach
- Location within Germany Location within Bavaria
- Coordinates: 48°32′N 11°20′E
- Country: Germany
- State: Bavaria
- Admin. region: Oberbayern
- District: Pfaffenhofen an der Ilm
- Subdivisions: 79 Ortsteile

Government
  - Mayor (2020–26): Martin Seitz (CSU)

Area
  - Total: 58.98 km^{2} (22.77 sq mi)
- Elevation: 459 m (1,506 ft)

Population (2025-12-31)
  - Total: 3,833
  - Density: 64.99/km^{2} (168.3/sq mi)
- Time zone: UTC+01:00 (CET)
  - Summer (DST): UTC+02:00 (CEST)
- Postal codes: 85302
- Dialling codes: 08445
- Vehicle registration: PAF
- Website: www.gerolsbach.de

Gerolsbach (German pronunciation: [ˈɡeːʁɔlsˌbax]) is a municipality in the district of Pfaffenhofen in Bavaria in Germany.
