= Ilmmünster =

- Municipality
- Coat of arms

- Location of Ilmmünster within Pfaffenhofen a.d.Ilm district
- Interactive map of Ilmmünster
- Location within Germany Location within Bavaria
- Coordinates: 48°29′N 11°30′E
- Country: Germany
- State: Bavaria
- Admin. region: Oberbayern
- District: Pfaffenhofen a.d.Ilm
- Municipal assoc.: Ilmmünster

Government
  - Mayor (2020–26): Georg Ott (CSU)

Area
  - Total: 13.89 km^{2} (5.36 sq mi)
- Elevation: 437–471 m (1,434–1,545 ft)

Population (2025-12-31)
  - Total: 2,193
  - Density: 157.9/km^{2} (408.9/sq mi)
- Time zone: UTC+01:00 (CET)
  - Summer (DST): UTC+02:00 (CEST)
- Postal codes: 85304
- Dialling codes: 08441
- Vehicle registration: PAF
- Website: www.ilmmuenster.de

Ilmmünster is a municipality in the district of Pfaffenhofen in Bavaria in Germany. It is not quite known by many, but it has many interesting places to visit based on history.
