= Münchsmünster Abbey =

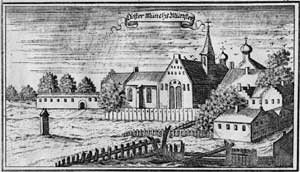
- Engraving of the abbey by Anton Wilhelm Ertl, 1687

- Location within Bavaria
- Interactive map of Münchsmünster Abbey

Monastery information
- Order: Benedictine
- Established: c. 790
- Disestablished: 1554
- Diocese: Regensburg

People
- Founder: Tassilo III, Duke of Bavaria

Site
- Coordinates: 48.765238°N 11.689708°E

Münchsmünster Abbey (German: Kloster Münchsmünster) was a monastery in Münchsmünster, Upper Bavaria, in the Electorate of Bavaria. It was closed in 1556 during the Protestant Reformation, and later was administered by Jesuits and then the Knights of Malta before being auctioned in 1817 and largely demolished. Some fragments have been preserved.

== History ==
The monastery was founded by Tassilo III, Duke of Bavaria (c. 741 – c. 796). In 925 it was a Benedictine establishment under the Diocese of Regensburg. The early monastery disappeared in the 10th century, and the buildings no longer exist. There are records of three churches being dedicated on 3-4 February 1092: the new monastery church, the parish church, which has survived, and a small chapel in which a precious Gothic baptismal font is now housed.

Bishop Otto of Bamberg rebuilt the monastery and in 1131 repopulated it with Benedictine monks from the Prüfening Abbey near Regensburg. The full name "Münchsmünster" first appears in 1141. Mitterwöhr first appears in 1350. The heyday of the monastery began with the inauguration of Wilhelm des Mendorfers (1403-50). However, during the upheavals of the Reformation, the monastery was closed in 1556.

The monastery came under secular administration. In 1598 the property was given to the Jesuit College at Ingolstadt. The Jesuits were dissolved in 1773. From 1778 to 1813 the monastery was administered by the Knights of Malta.

== Destruction ==
In 1815 the monastery and church were dissolved. The monastery complex was auctioned, starting in 1817. The complex was largely demolished, and the stones were used to build new houses, including the nearby Gasthof Rauscher. The only building that remains is the Forsthaus (Forest House), which was modified in 1688 when the original roof was replaced by a steep gable roof containing three upper floors. The west portal of the former abbey church on St Peter is also still standing. In 1819 the city magistrate of Landshut bought archivolts and walls, which were integrated into construction of the cemetery portal, complete in 1820. They give some sense of the rich sculptural decoration of the abbey church. In 1891-92 the Bavarian National Museum in Munich obtained other fragments of the church that had been immured in some buildings.

== Excavations ==
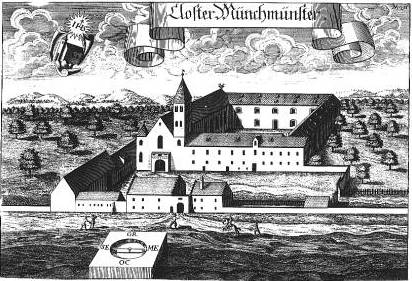
Kloster Muenchsmuenster (1701) by Michael Wening

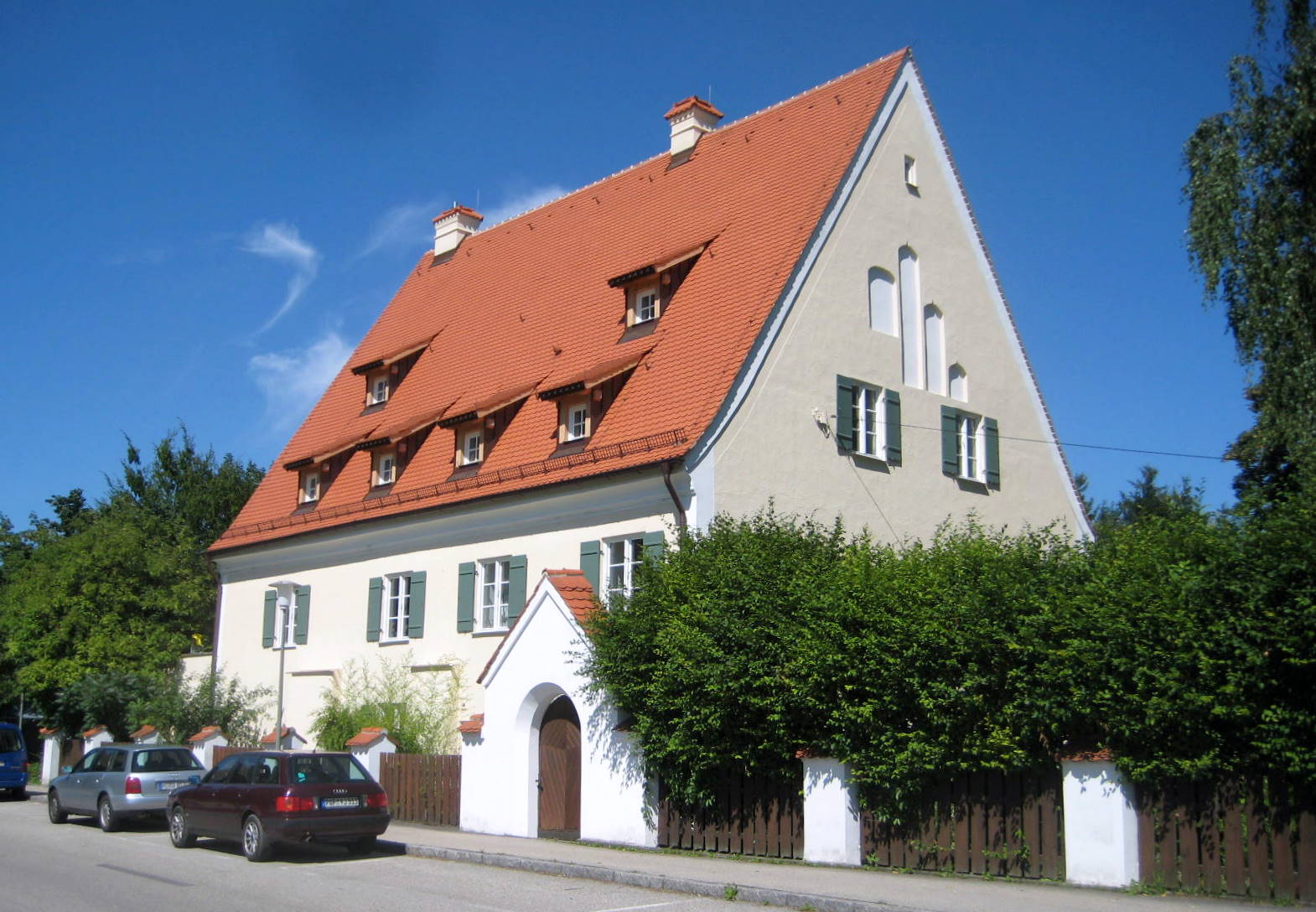
Forest house, an original building with a steep new roof added in 1688

Archaeological explorations of part of the site of the former monastery were undertaken in 1992-93, prior to construction of a kindergarten. The excavated area held the former atrium of the monastery with its farm buildings and gatehouses. The layout is known from a view of the monastery by Michael Wening published in the first volume of his Historico - Topographica Descriptio von Ober- und Niederbayern (1701). Findings included the foundations of a church with a recessed rectangular choir dating from the 10th or 11th century, before the Romanesque period, and traces of later buildings. A fountain built in 1408-09 on the west side of the abbey was found. There were numerous glass and pottery shards, some complete glasses and bottles and an enamel cup.

In 2012 further excavations were undertaken, since there were plans to extend the kindergarten. This covered an area of 2,500 square metres (27,000 sq ft), the largest monastery excavation in Bavaria. The findings clarified the history of building. An early wooden building, possibly multistory, was destroyed by fire in the second half of the 10th century. It was replaced by a building made of limestone blocks, which was demolished in 1250. Material from that building was used in part for a new building, erected just south of the original location. That building was in turn dismantled in the second half of the 15th century. This part of the monastery then remained undeveloped, and perhaps held the monastery garden. In 1500 building began in the eastern part of the site, where there are numerous remains including a cellar and many other structures from the redesigned monastery. An exceptional discovery is a bronze bracket with a depiction of a saint from around the 10th century.
