= Ilm (Bavaria) =

River in Bavaria, Germany

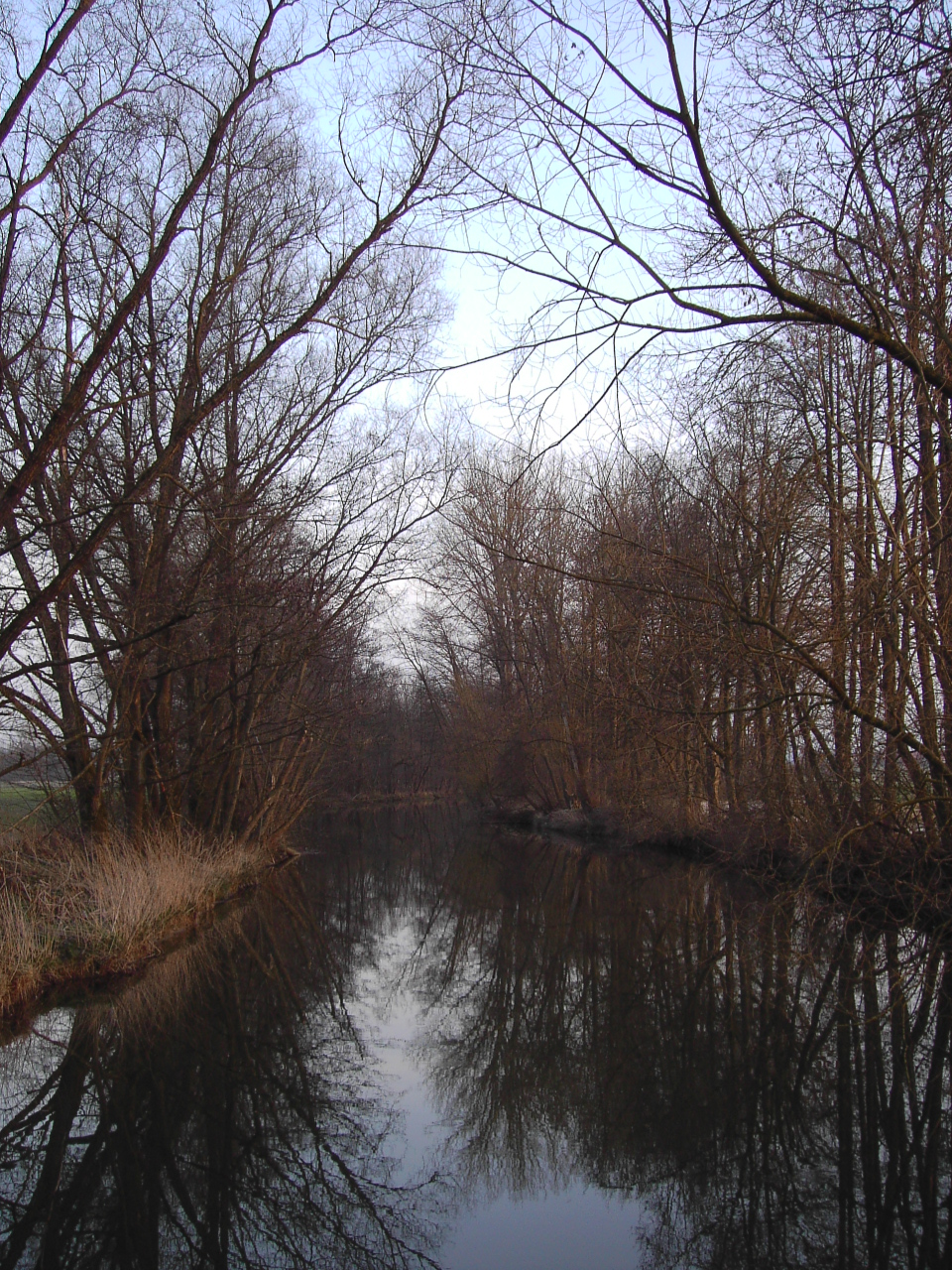
- River Ilm in Geisenfeld

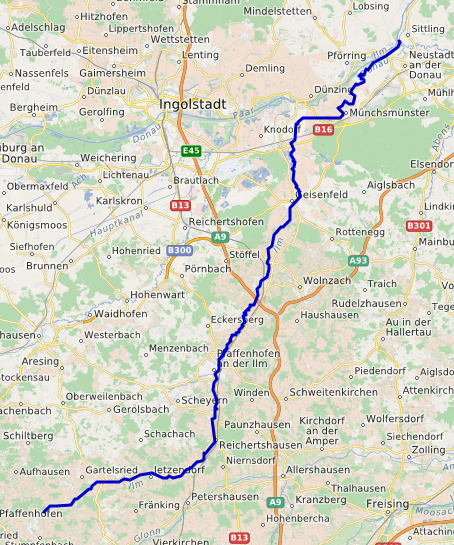

Location
- Country: Germany

Physical characteristics
- Source
  - location: Upper Bavaria
- Mouth
  - location: Abens
  - coordinates: 48°49′43″N 11°45′36″E
- Length: 83.8 km (52.1 mi)
- Basin size: 579 km^{2} (224 sq mi)

Basin features
- Progression: Abens→ Danube→ Black Sea

The Ilm (German pronunciation: [ɪlm]) is a river in Bavaria, Germany, left tributary of the Abens. Its source is near Altomünster. It is approx. 84 km long. It flows generally north through the small towns Hilgertshausen-Tandern, Reichertshausen, Pfaffenhofen an der Ilm, Geisenfeld and Vohburg. It flows into the Abens near Neustadt an der Donau.
