= Abens =

River in Germany

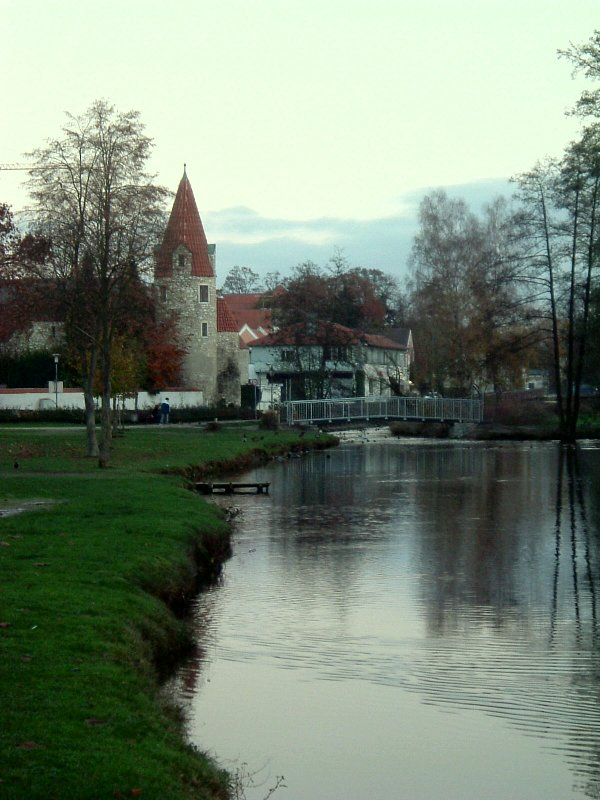
- The Abens in Abensberg

- Mouth

Location
- Country: Germany

Physical characteristics
- Source
  - location: Hallertau
- Mouth
  - location: Danube
  - coordinates: 48°51′26″N 11°46′11″E
- Length: 71.1 km (44.2 mi)
- Basin size: 1,020 km^{2} (390 sq mi)

Basin features
- Progression: Danube→ Black Sea

The Abens (German pronunciation: [ˈaːbn̩s]) is a river in Bavaria, Germany, and a right-bank tributary of the Danube. Its source is near Au in der Hallertau. Some 71 kilometres (44 mi) long, the Abens flows generally northward through the small towns of Au in der Hallertau, Rudelzhausen, Mainburg, Siegenburg, and Abensberg. It empties into the Danube at Eining, part of Neustadt an der Donau.

== See also ==
- List of rivers of Bavaria
