= Klosterbrauerei Andechs =

German brewery

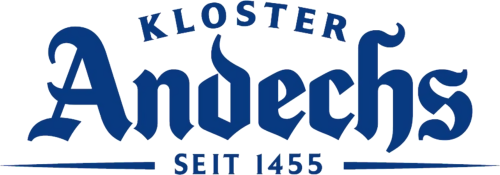

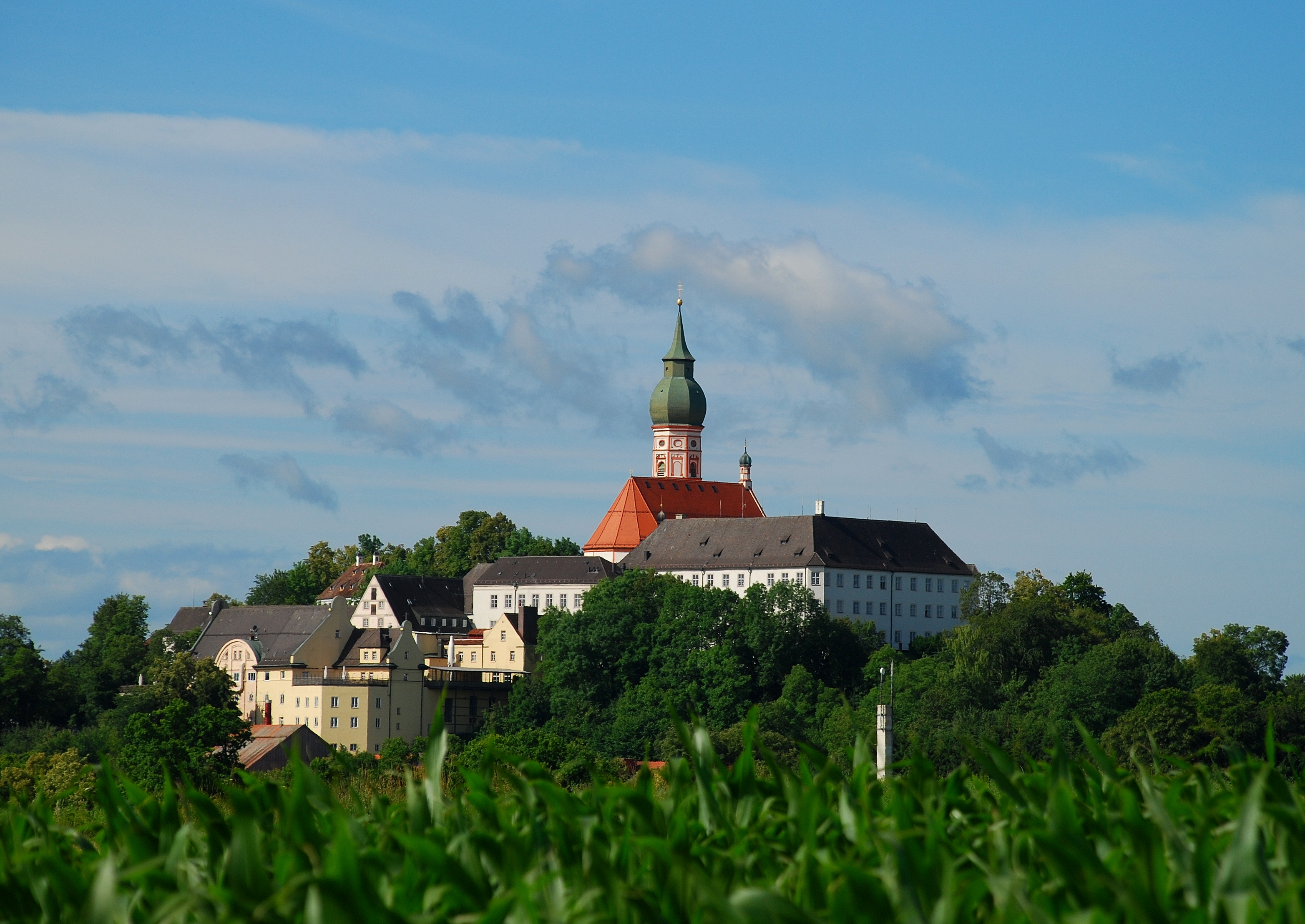
- Andechs Abbey
- Location: Andechs, Bavaria, Germany
- Coordinates: 47°58′28″N 11°10′59″E
- Opened: 1455
- Annual production volume: Over 100,000 hectolitres (85,000 US bbl)

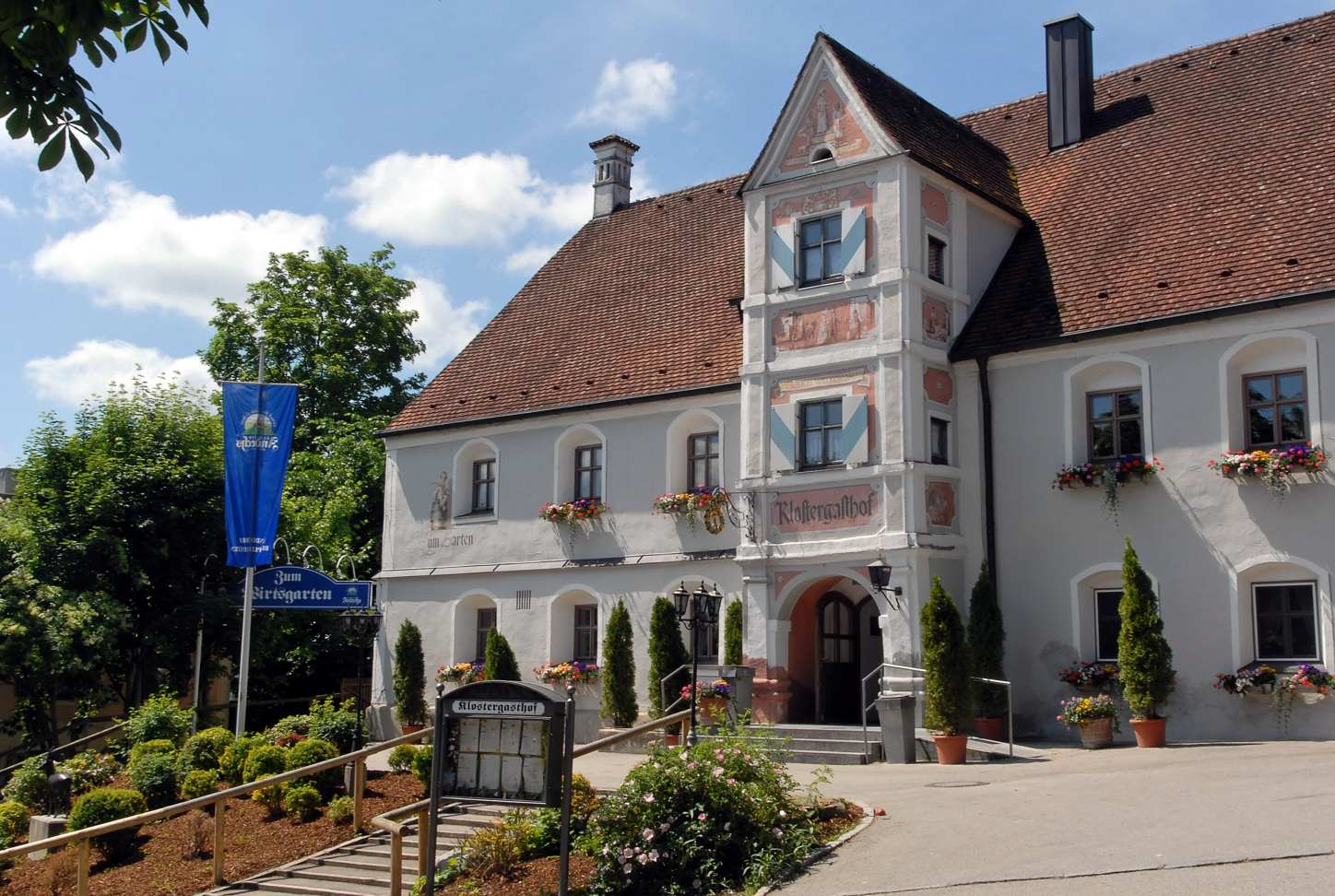
Klostergasthof Andechs, a restaurant and Biergarten at the abbey

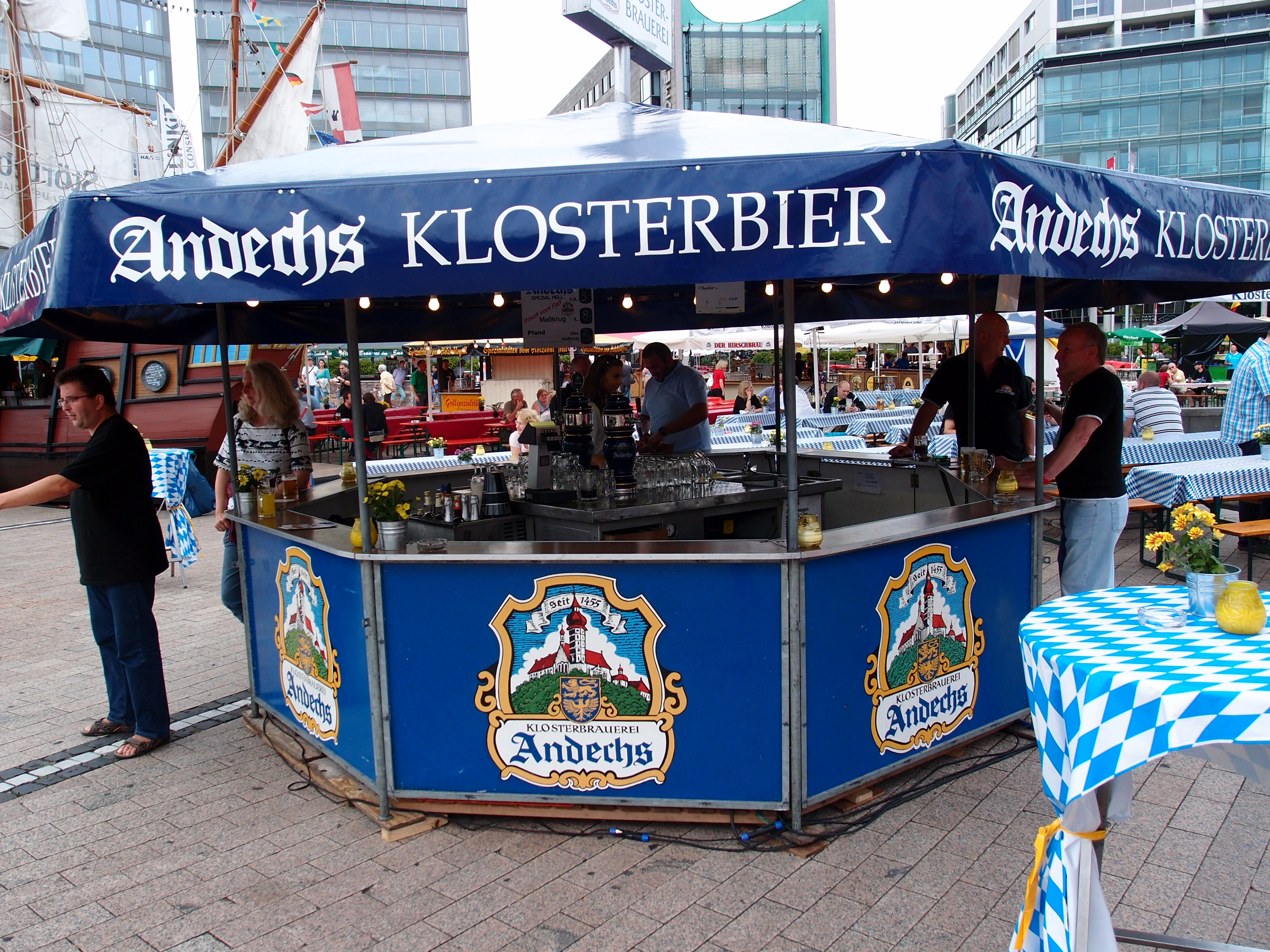
A tent from Andechs at the 2012 beer festival in Cologne

The Klosterbrauerei Andechs is a monastic brewery in Andechs, Upper Bavaria, Germany, well known for its Andechser beers. The brewery is run by the monks of Andechs Abbey, a priory of St. Boniface's Abbey, a Benedictine abbey situated 40 km away in Munich. It is the only monastic brewery in Germany that brews Bock beer year-round for nationwide distribution.

Every year, the brewery produces over 100,000 hectolitres (85,000 US bbl) of beer. A portion of the beer is served on-site at a restaurant and Biergarten at the abbey, Klostergasthof Andechs; the remainder is exported throughout Germany and worldwide. The activities of the Andechs monks, such as help for the homeless in Munich, are financed with proceeds from brewery - without the aid of any church tax funds.

== History ==
The earliest documented reference to beer being brewed in Andechs Abbey dates to 1455. The Benedictine monks have continued the brewing tradition in the centuries since. A seven-story malt house was built on the site in 1906, and the first bottling facility was added in 1950. In 1972, the abbey decided to create a separate brewing facility at the foot of the mountain, which was completed in 1974, followed by a new brewing building in 1983. The fermentation and storage facilities were expanded in 2006, and the brewhouse was renovated in 2007.

== Beers ==
Andechser beers are brewed exclusively in Andechs using the traditional multiple mashing process. Only aroma hops are used, no bitter hops. The best-known beer is the Doppelbock Dunkel, with an original extract of 18.5% (18.5° Plato or 1.076 original gravity) and over 7% Alcohol by volume. In addition, the brewery produces a Helles, Spezial Hell, Bergbock Hell, Export Dunkel, Hefeweizen, and Dunkelweizen.

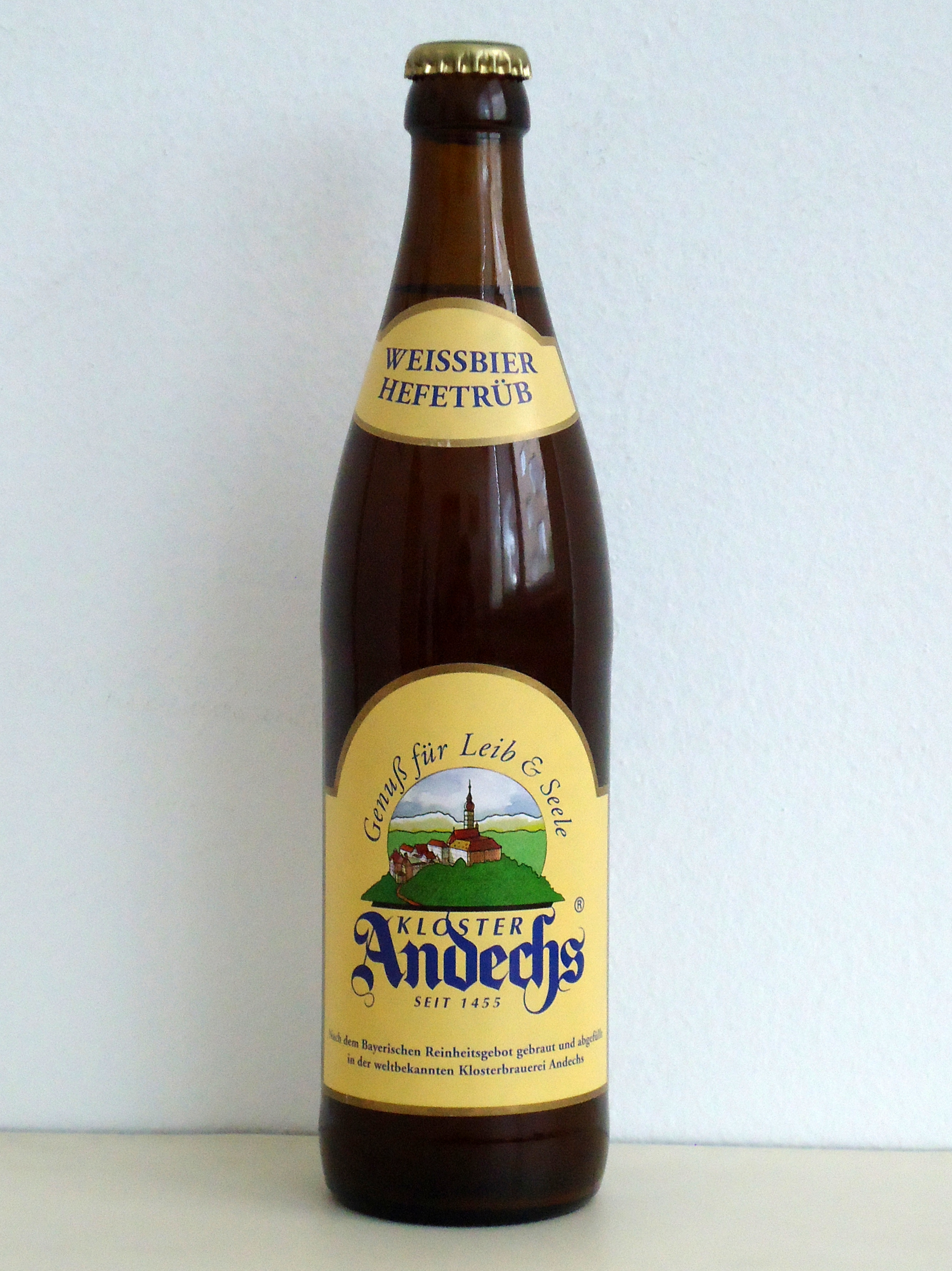
Andechser Weißbier Hefetrüb

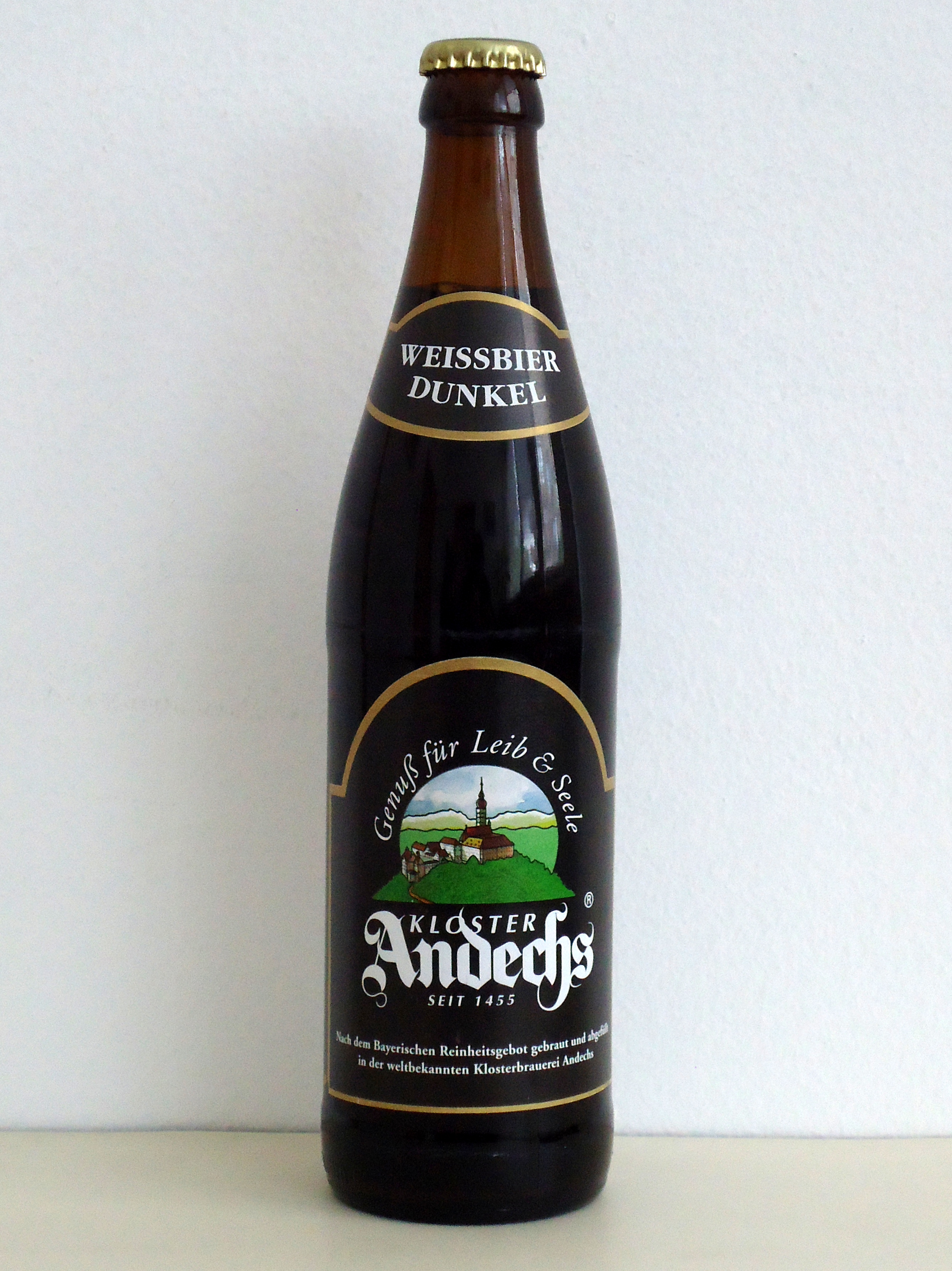
Andechser Weißbier Dunkel

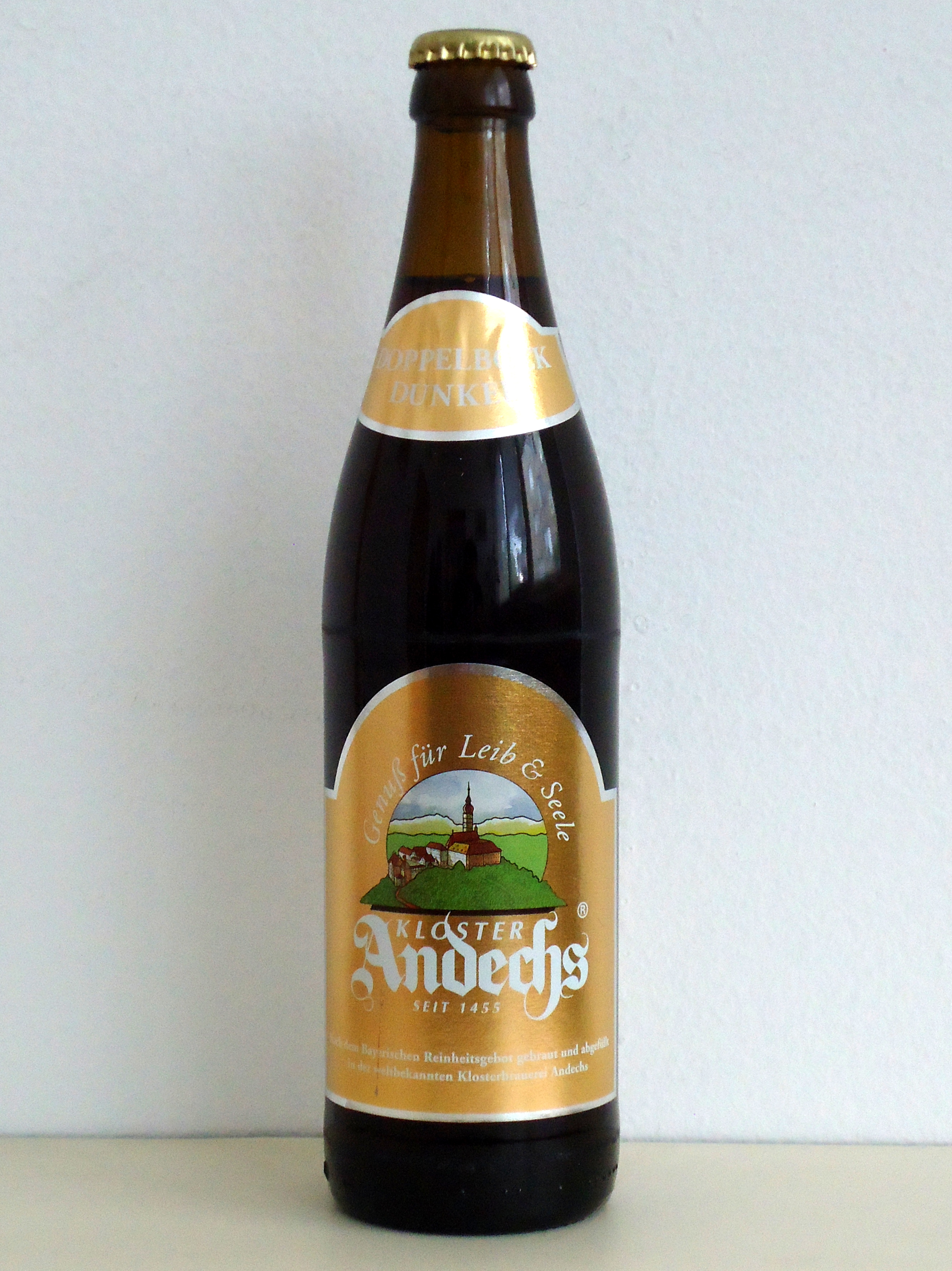
Andechser Doppelbock Dunkel
