= Andechs Abbey =

Monastery in Bavaria

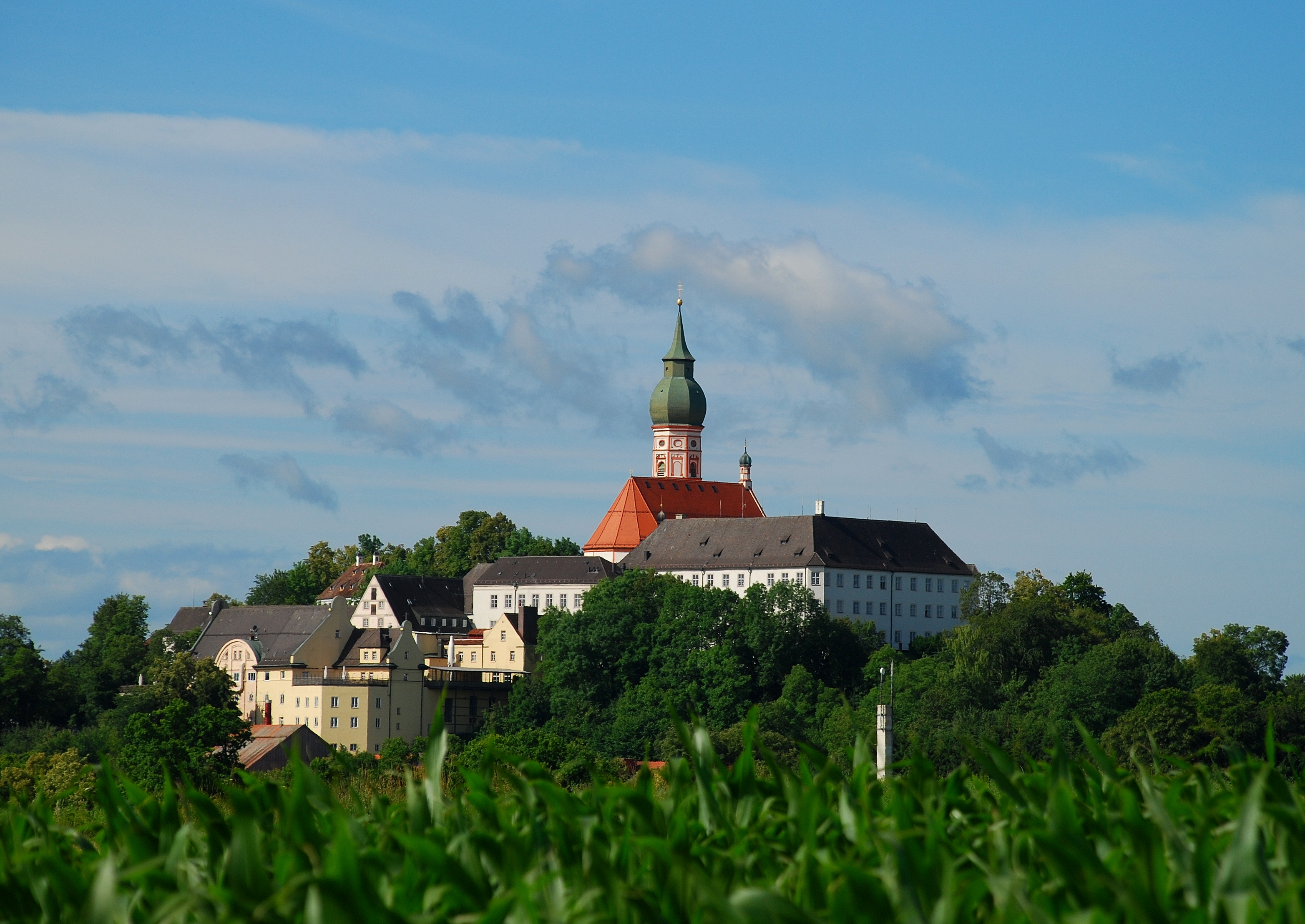
- Andechs Abbey

- Location within Bavaria Location within Germany

Monastery information
- Order: Benedictine
- Denomination: Catholic

Site
- Location: Landkreis of Starnberg (Upper Bavaria)
- Country: Germany
- Coordinates: 47°58′29″N 11°10′57″E
- Website: www.andechs.de/index.php?id2&L0

Andechs Abbey is a Benedictine monastery, now a priory but formerly an abbey, in the municipality of Andechs, in the Landkreis of Starnberg, Upper Bavaria, Germany. A place of pilgrimage on a hill east of the Ammersee, the Abbey is famed for its flamboyant Baroque church and its brewery, Klosterbrauerei Andechs, the proceeds from which help fund the monks' mission of help. Composer Carl Orff is buried in the church.

== Background ==
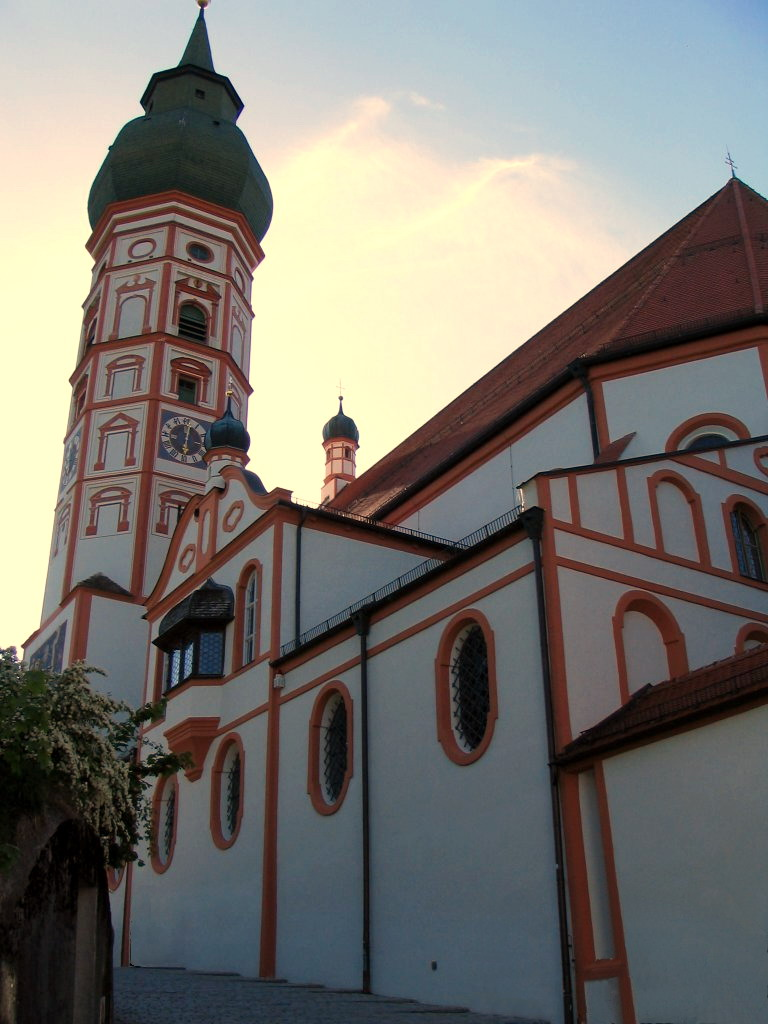
Abbey Church

In 955, relics brought from Rome and the Holy Land by Rasso, count of Diessen, to his monastery at Wörth (later called Grafrath) were transferred to the heilege Berg (holy mountain) to preserve them from the ravages of the Hungarians. Around 1100, Berthold II, Count of Andechs built a new residence on a hill outside Andechs. In the 12th century three hosts, reputed to have been consecrated by Pope Gregory I and Pope Leo IX, were added to the relics at the heilige Berg. The first documented pilgrimages to Andechs were in 1138, when Count Berthold ordered his subjects to make the journey to venerate the relics in the chapel of St Nicholas at the Schloss. The Andechs were also benefactors of Langheim Abbey.

In his struggle with the House of Wittelsbach over his Bavarian possessions, Otto II of Andechs and Merania lost his ancestral seat in Andechs. Andechs castle falls into disrepair around the middle of the 13th century and only the Chapel of St. Nicholas remains. With Otto's death in 1248, the Duchy of Merania expired. Upon the death of his uncle, Berthold (patriarch of Aquileia), the House of Andechs became extinct.

== The heilige Berg ==
The legendary rediscovery of long-lost reliquaries in 1388 revived the ancient pilgrimage trade. The Andechs hosts were approved by Cardinal Nicholas of Cusa, otherwise a foe of such cults of wonder hosts.

=== First foundation ===
Ernest, Duke of Bavaria (1392–1438) built the late-Gothic collegiate church which was completed in 1423. He also named the Andechs mountain the “Heilige Berg”. At first, the church was tended by Augustinian canons from Dießen. They were replaced by Benedictine monks from Tegernsee Abbey in 1455. In 1458 it was raised to the status of an abbey, and thenceforth enjoyed a period of uninterrupted prosperity as a popular pilgrimage site. A pipe organ was built at the abbey by Daniel Hayl the elder in the year 1615. In 1669 lightning struck the top of the tower causing a fire which burned down everything but the chapel and the guest wing. The church was re-roofed and the monastery re-occupied two years later. The monastery was remodeled (in Baroque style) in 1712; it came under the secularization laws in 1803.

=== Second foundation ===
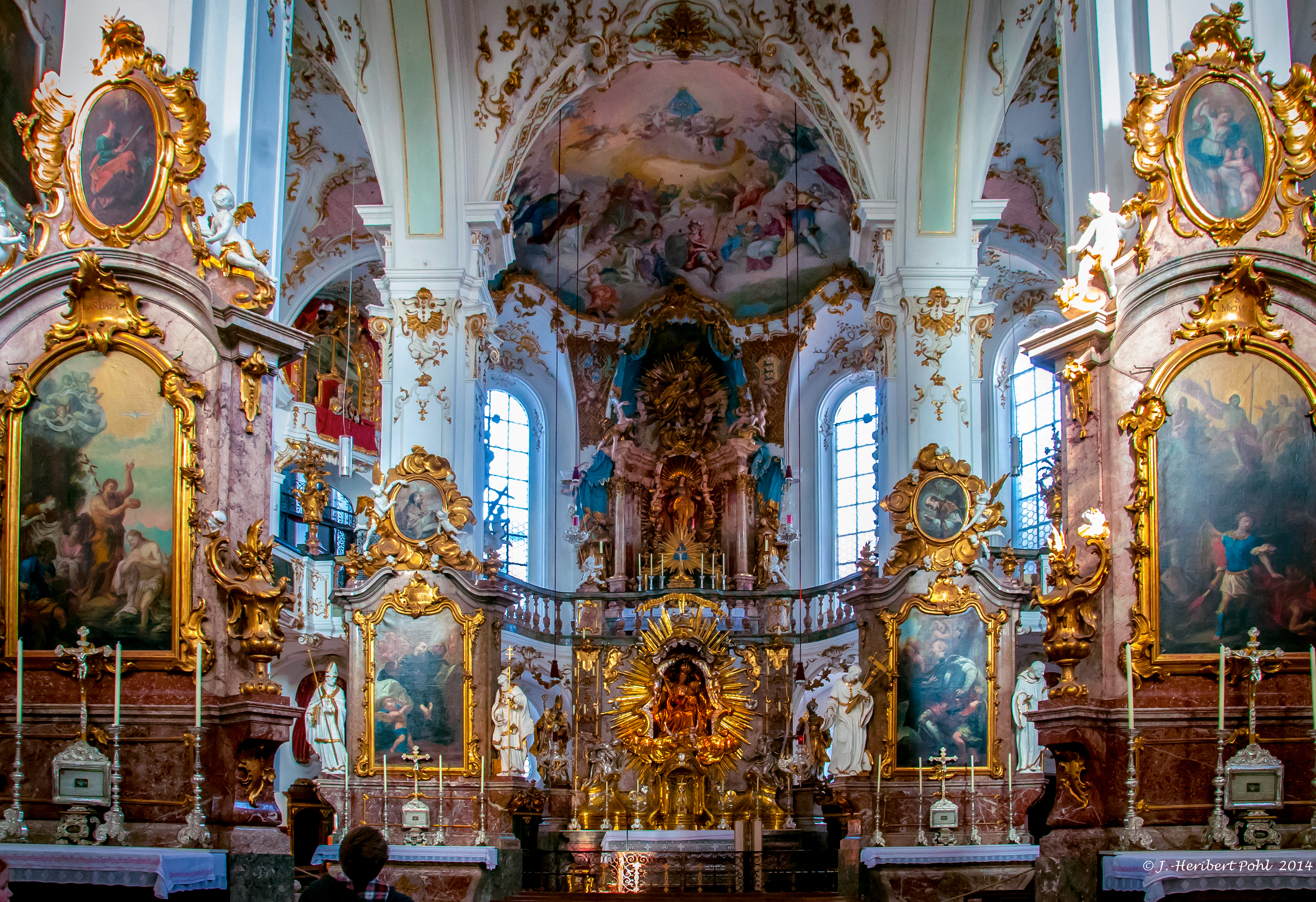
Interior of SS Nicolaus and Elizabeth church, Andechs Abbey

It was refounded in 1850 as a Benedictine priory, affiliated to the Abbey of St Boniface in Munich. During World War II, much of St Boniface's library was sheltered at Andechs. In 1974 the monks began construction of a new monastery brewery.

The present church dates from the 18th century. The 20th-century German composer Carl Orff is buried there. There are also the graves of 11 members of the House of Wittelsbach inside the church, mostly from the 15th and 16th centuries. More recent burials of members of the former Bavarian Royal Family took place on a graveyard in the abbey garden, installed by Albrecht, Duke of Bavaria in 1977, as the royal tomb at Theatine Church, Munich had no more space.

The monastery hosts a number of cultural programs including a summer organ festival, the Carl Orff Festival and various symposiums.

Erling, huddled at the foot of the abbey, was created as an independent town in 1818. Erling, Frieding and Machtlfing were united in 1978 as the Gemeinde Andechs.

== Klosterbrauerei Andechs ==
Klosterbrauerei Andechs is a monastic brewery at the Abbey run by its monks, well known for its Andechser beers. Every year, the brewery produces over 100,000 hectolitres (85,000 US bbl) of beer. A portion of the beer is served on-site at a restaurant and Biergarten at the abbey, Klostergasthof Andechs; the remainder is exported throughout Germany and worldwide. The Andechs monks finance their many activities, such as help for the homeless in Munich, with proceeds from brewery - without the aid of any church tax funds.

== People ==
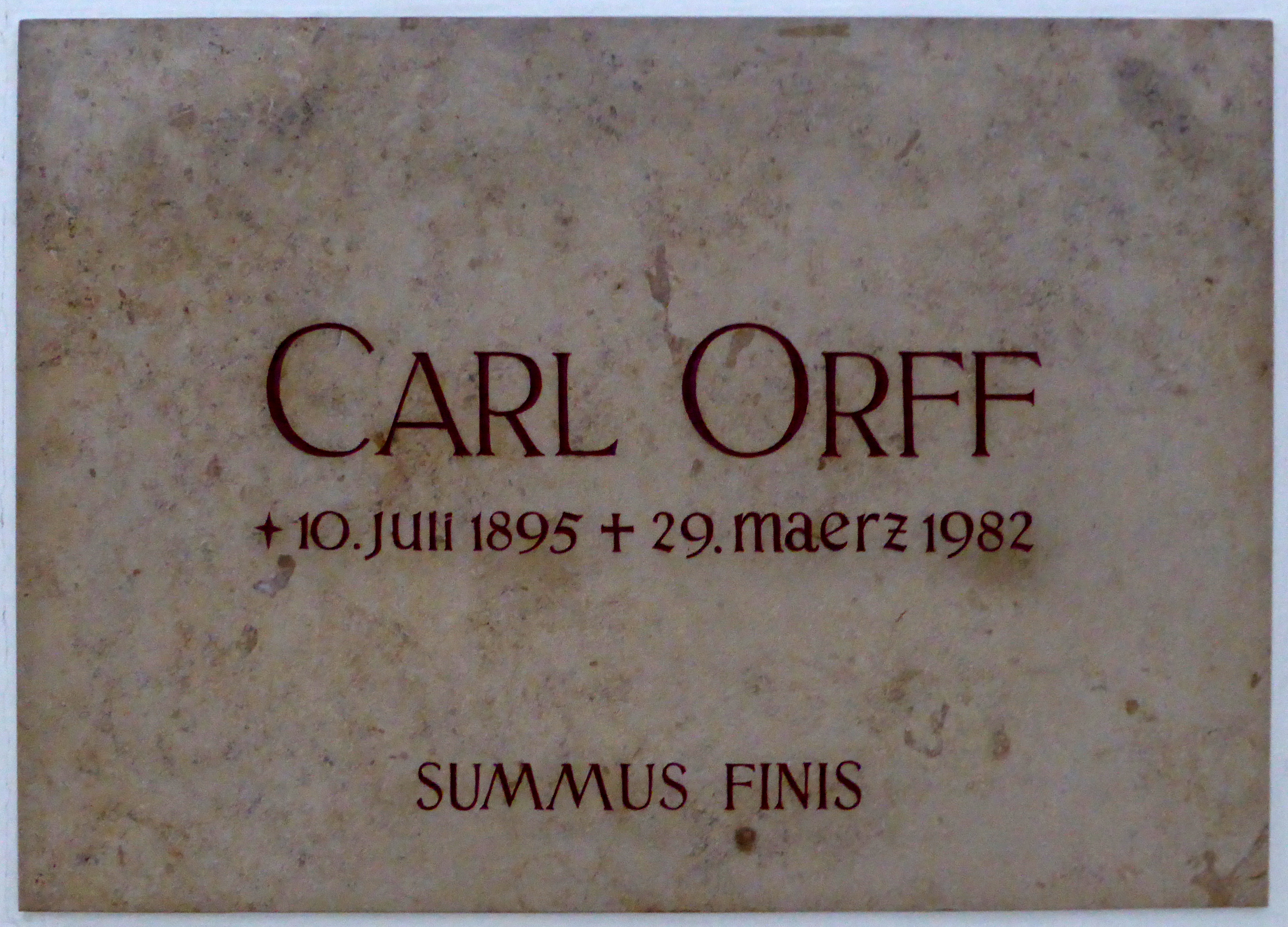
Tomb of Carl Orff in Andechs

=== Monks ===
- Anton Pelchinger, illustrator

=== Burials ===
- Carl Orff, 20th-century German composer
- Prince Konrad of Bavaria
- Albrecht, Duke of Bavaria
- Prince Konstantin of Bavaria
- Prince Heinrich of Bavaria (1922–1958)

== See also ==
- Hohenwart Abbey
