= Rasso =

Bavarian count and military leader

Saint Rasso of Andechs
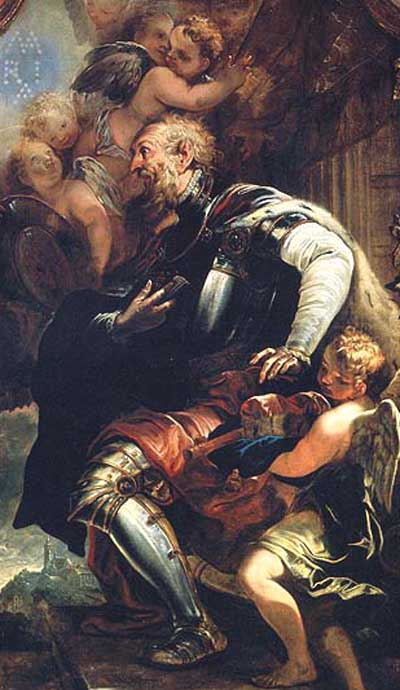
- Born: c. 900
- Died: 953
- Feast: May 17; May 19 (Grafrath, Andechs)
- Attributes: military attire
- Patronage: invoked against stomach pains, especially in children

Saint Rasso of Andechs (also Rasso of Grafrath, Graf Ratt, Ratho, Grafrath, Rasso von Andechs) (c. 900–953) was a Bavarian count and military leader, pilgrim, and saint. He was the count (Graf) of Dießen-Andechs, leading the Bavarians against invading Magyars in the tenth century. No contemporary Vita of Rasso has survived and various legends arose around his cult in the late Middle Ages. However, there is no reason to doubt that there existed a count named Rasso who fought against the Magyars in the 950s.

As a middle-aged man, he went on a pilgrimage to the Holy Land and Rome, where he collected relics, returning to found a Benedictine abbey at Wörth, later named Grafrath after him.

He was a large man. When his relics were exhumed in 1468, it was determined that he was some 2 meters (6 ft 6 in) tall, although it was previously thought that he was even taller, since the size of his actual grave was 2 and a half meters.

== Veneration ==
The healing shrine and pilgrimage church (Wallfahrtskirche) of St. Rasso at Grafrath received many visitors during the Middle Ages and afterwards; records of the miracles attributed to him between the years 1444 and 1728 consist of 12,131 entries.

In 955, the relics that Rasso had brought from Rome and the Holy Land to his monastery at Wörth were transferred to Andechs Abbey to preserve them from the ravages of the Magyars.
