= Hohenwart Abbey =

Coordinates: 48°35′51″N 11°22′33″E

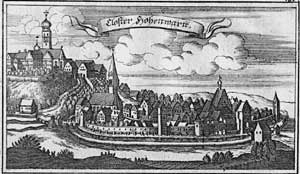
Engraving of Hohenwart from the "Churbaierische Atlas" of Anton Wilhelm Ertl, 1687

Hohenwart Abbey (German: Kloster Hohenwart) was a Benedictine nunnery located at Hohenwart in Bavaria, Germany.

The nunnery was founded in 1074, presumably from the monastery at Andechs, by Count Ortolf and his sister Wiltrudis, last of the noble family of the Rapotonen. In the 12th century the recluse Richildis lived here, later pronounced Blessed. In 1215 a chapel was built in her honour where she was buried, to which from the 15th century onwards pilgrimages took place. It was dissolved in 1803 during the secularisation of Bavaria. However, the nunnery buildings found no buyers, and so the existing nuns were allowed to stay there until the end of their lives.

In 1878 the empty buildings were bought by Dr Johann Evangelist Wagner, governor of the priests' seminary at Dillingen for use as a home for the deaf, dumb and blind, with the help of the Franciscan Sisters of Dillingen. In 1895 the buildings, including the church, burnt down and the entire facility was rebuilt. It continues to operate with the Franciscan Sisters as part of the charitable Regens-Wagner-Stiftung for the disabled.

Of the nunnery, although the principal buildings are destroyed, there remain the Romanesque St. Peter's Chapel, the Romanesque–Gothic cloister, the late-Gothic Bl. Richildis Chapel and the abbey pharmacy with the probably unique Rococo representation of "Christ the Apothecary" in stucco from 1739.
