= Andechs (restaurant) =

Monastery restaurant in Andechs Abbey, Bavaria, German

Klostergasthof Andechs
- Industry: Restaurant
- Founded: 1438
- Headquarters: Bergstraße 9, 82346 Andechs, Germany
- Website: www.klostergasthof.de

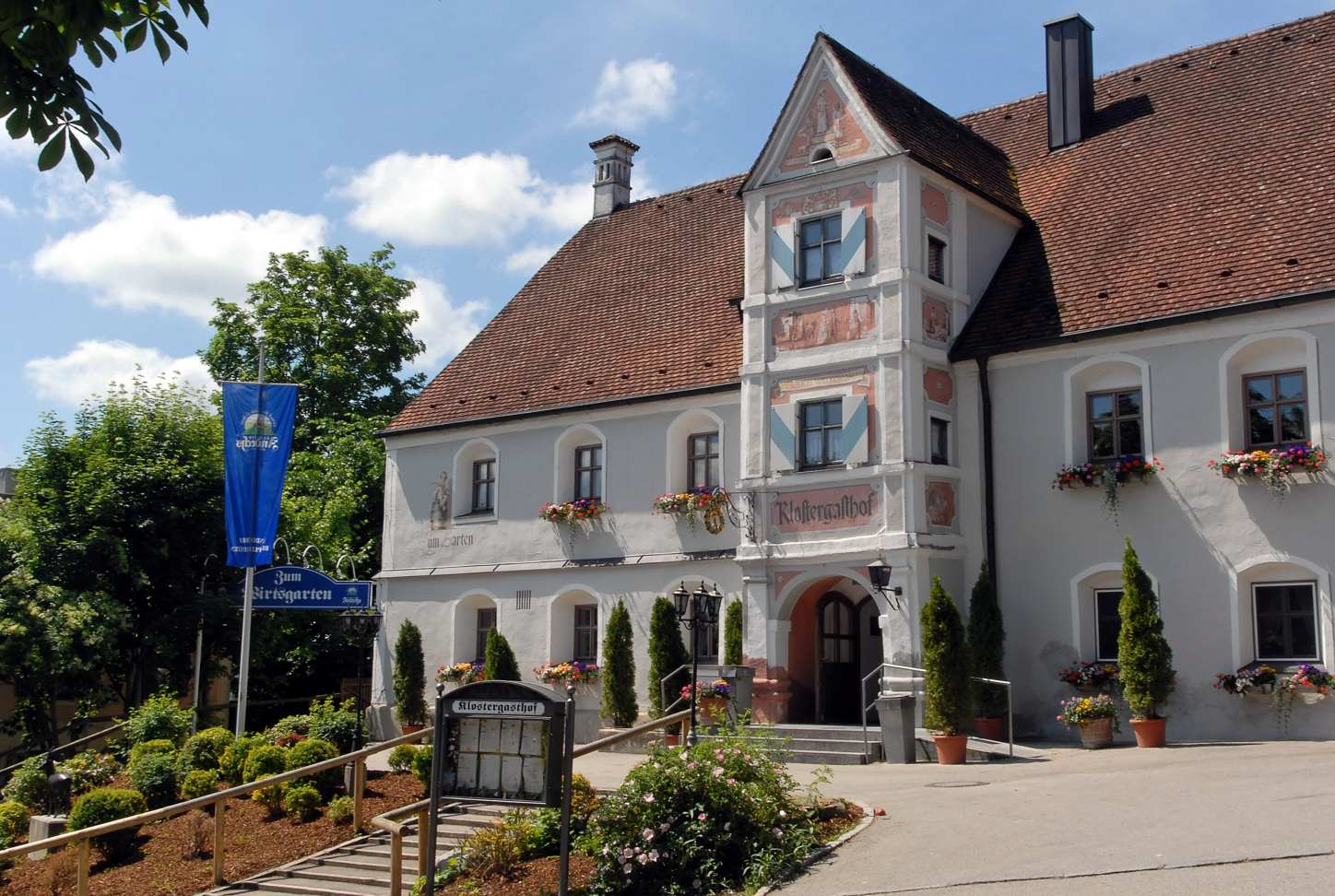
Klostergasthof Andechs

Klostergasthof Andechs is a monastery restaurant in Andechs Abbey, Bavaria, Germany.

In the middle of 15th century, Duke Albrecht III donated this "most worthy of inns" to the newly founded Benedictine abbey at Andechs. Opened in 1438, the Klostergasthof serves the beers of Klosterbrauerei Andechs, brewed at the Abbey by the monks. The proceeds from beer sales at the restaurant, as well as throughout Germany and exports abroad, go towards funding the order's mission of help, such as its shelter for the homeless in Munich.

Klostergasthof tavern was renovated in 1992 and three rooms were added during refurbishment.

== See also ==
- List of German restaurants
- List of oldest companies
