= Forstlicher Versuchsgarten Grafrath =

Arboretum in Grafrath, Bavaria, Germany

Coordinates: 48.1312°N 11.1585°E

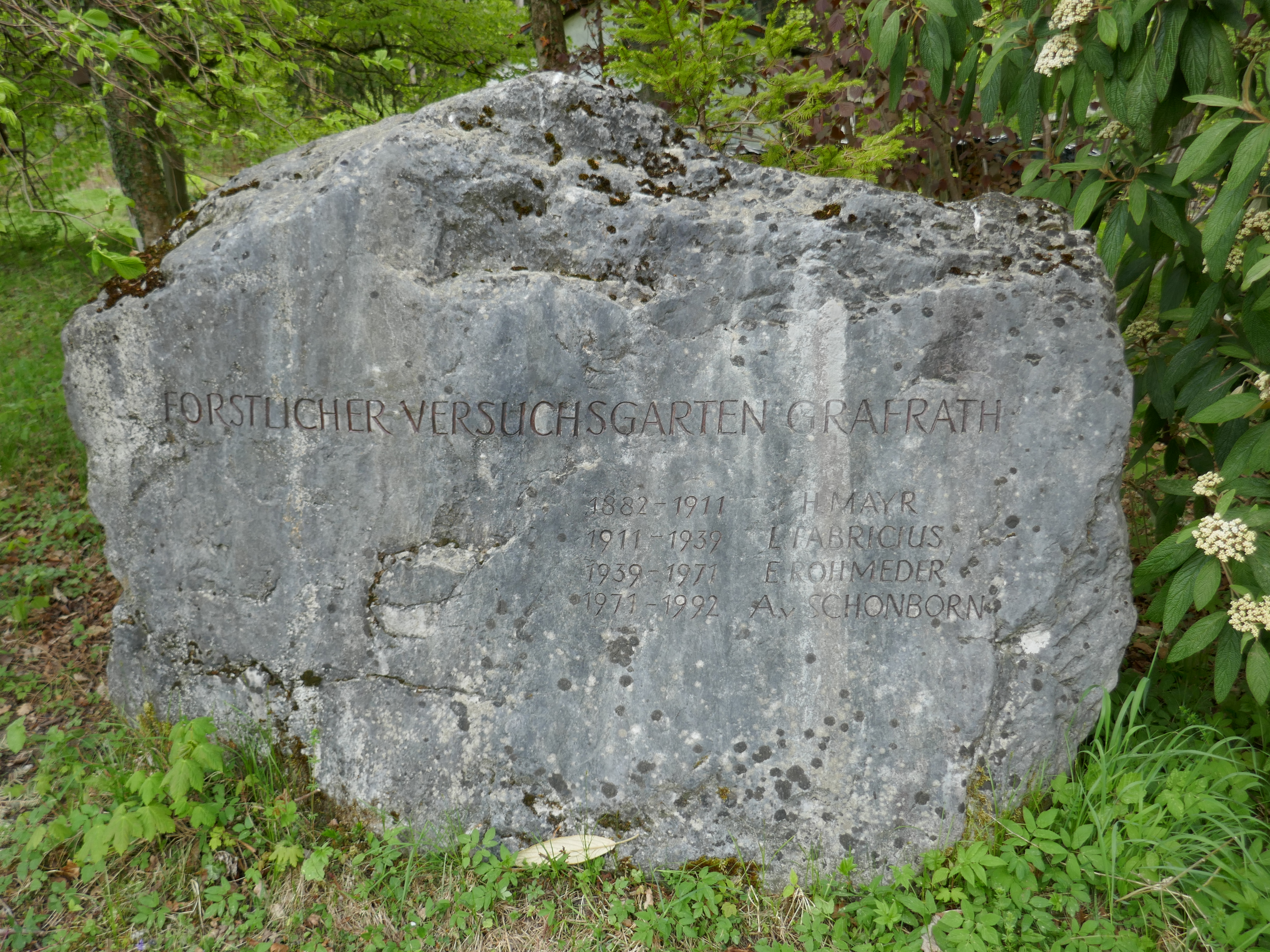
Forstlicher Versuchsgarten Grafrath

The Forstlicher Versuchsgarten Grafrath is an arboretum in Grafrath, Bavaria, Germany.

The arboretum is located at Jesenwanger Strasse 11, Grafrath. It is 34 hectares (84 acres) large. It is open without charge on weekdays in the warmer months. It was established in 1881, and since 1995 has been maintained by the Bayerische Landesanstalt für Wald und Forstwirtschaft (LWF). It contains over 200 species of foreign trees and shrubs from the Americas, Asia, and Europe.

== See also ==
- List of botanical gardens in Germany
