= St. Boniface's Abbey =

Building in Munich

- Abtei St. Bonifaz
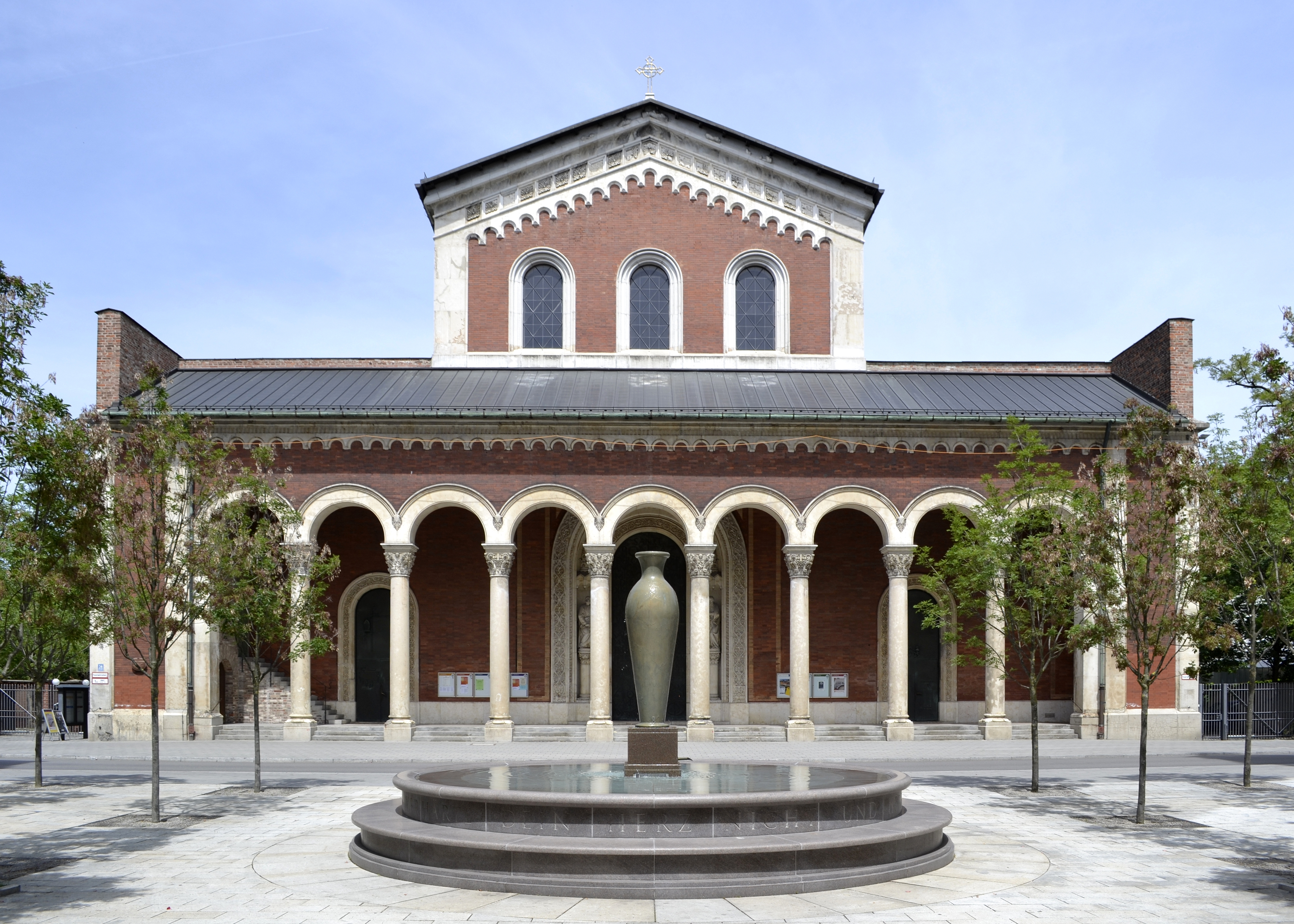
- St. Boniface's Abbey

- Location within Bavaria Location within Germany

Religion
- Affiliation: Catholic
- Sect: Benedictines

Location
- Location: Maxvorstadt, Munich, Bavaria, Germany
- Country: Germany
- Coordinates: 48°8′38″N 11°33′51″E

Architecture
- Completed: 1835

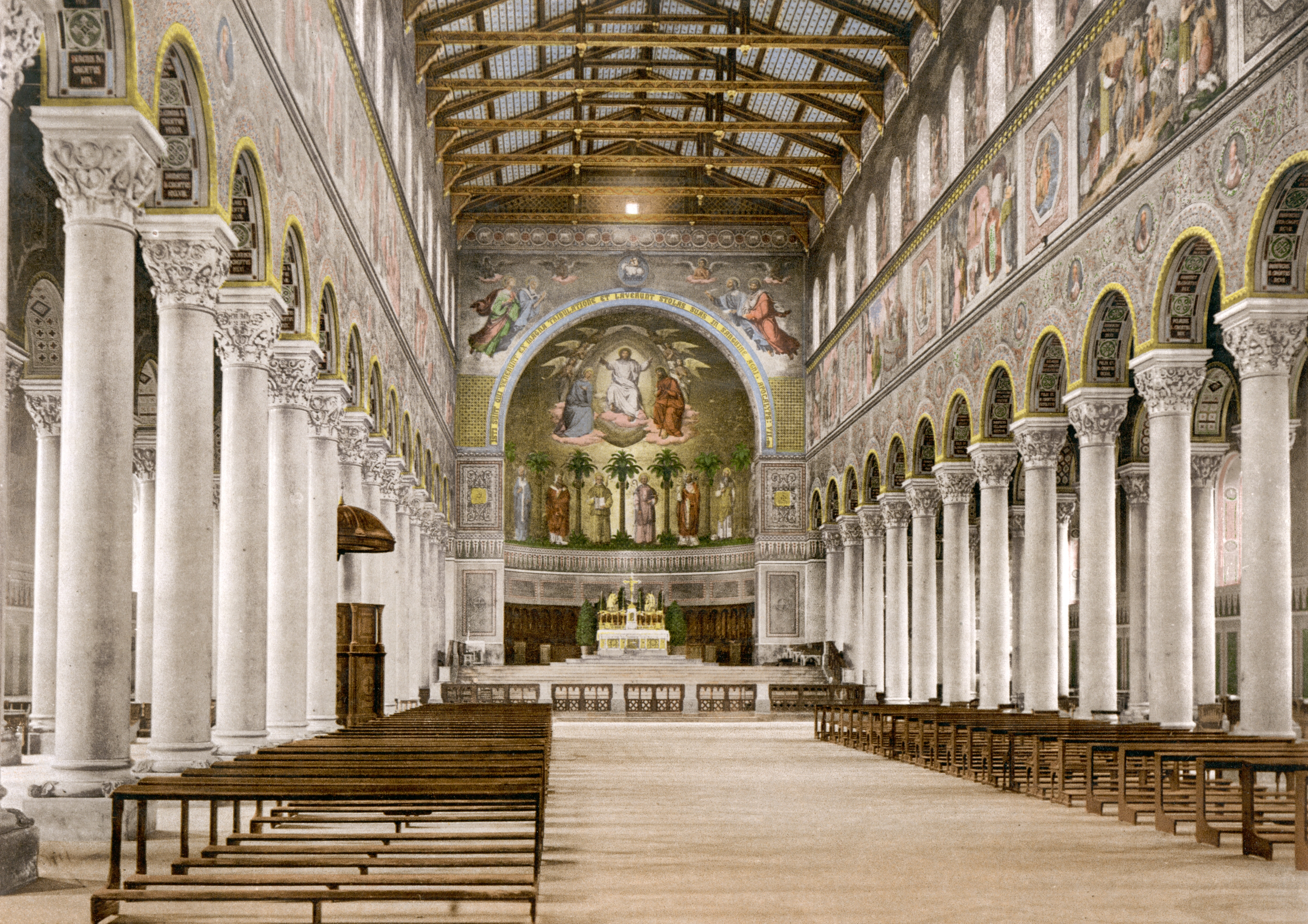
St. Boniface's Abbey interior c. 1894

St. Boniface's Abbey (German: Abtei St. Bonifaz) is a Benedictine monastery in Maxvorstadt, Munich, Bavaria, Germany. It was founded in 1835 by King Ludwig I of Bavaria, as a part of his efforts to reanimate the country's spiritual life by the restoration of the monasteries destroyed during the secularisation of the early 19th century.

The abbey, constructed in Byzantine style, was formally dedicated in 1850. It was destroyed during World War II and only partly restored. The church contains the tombs of King Ludwig I and of his queen, Therese of Saxe-Hildburghausen.

St. Boniface's is situated in a city, which is unusual for a Benedictine monastery. To ensure the material provision of the monks, King Ludwig bought the former Andechs Abbey, which had been secularised in 1803, along with its supporting farmlands and gave it to the new abbey. For this reason Andechs is now a priory of St. Boniface's Abbey.

The monks work in the pastoral care of the parish, in scholarly and educational fields and in the care of the homeless. The present abbot (as of 2014) is Johannes Eckert, whom the monks elected on 23 July 2003 on the retirement of the previous abbot, Odilo Lechner.

St. Boniface's Abbey is a member of the Bavarian Congregation within the Benedictine Confederation.

== Abbots ==
- Paulus Birker (1850–1854)
- Bonifaz Haneberg (1854–1872)
- Benedikt Zenetti (1872–1904)
- Gregor Danner (1904–1919)
- Bonifaz Wöhrmüller (1919–1951)
- Hugo Lang (1951–1967)
- Odilo Lechner (coadjutor 1964–1967; abbot 1967–2003)
- Johannes Eckert (2013-)

== Sources ==
- Lebendige Steine. St. Bonifaz in München. 150 Jahre Benediktinerabtei und Pfarrei. Eine Ausstellung der Benediktinerabtei St. Bonifaz München und Andechs und des Bayerischen Hauptstaatsarchivs zum 150. Jubiläum der Gründung durch König Ludwig I. München 2000 (Ausstellungskataloge der Staatlichen Archive Bayerns; 42) [exhibition catalogue produced by the Bavarian State Archives for the 150th anniversary of the abbey's foundation] ISBN 3-921635-60-8
