= Franciscan Sisters of Dillingen =

The Congregation of Franciscan Sisters of Dillingen began in Dillingen, Bavaria in 1241 when "Count Hartmann IV of Dillingen and his son, Hartmann V, Bishop of Augsburg (1248-1286), donated to the Community of Ladies in Dillingen a house near the parish church and with it one lot of land, a cabbage patch and a meadow."

== History ==
The community is now the oldest group of Third Order Franciscan Sisters in continuous existence. The founders wanted the women to "serve God, their Creator, peacefully, devoutly, and zealously for the benefit of all the faithful, giving praise and honor to the Blessed Trinity." About 200 years later, in 1438, the building burned and all the founding documents were lost. For about 200 years, from the late 1500s until the late 1700s, the community was more secluded, living more of a contemplative life rather than being active out in the community. In 1774, however, Prince Bishop Clemens Wenceslaus had the Sisters to take over the elementary school for girls. Four Sisters volunteered to teach. It was their involvement in this important ministry that probably saved the community for obliteration during the secularization of Germany in the early 1800s.

== Present day ==
The Franciscan Sisters of Dillingen serve in several countries: Germany, Brazil, Spain, India and the United States. In the United States, their ministries include: "retreat work, serving in a rural nursing home with independent living, childcare and preschool, serving adults in a large assisted living facility, health care services and board membership on several CHI healthcare facilities, teaching in a parish school and religious education program, pro-life work, and working with the youth."

In 1929, the sisters opened St. Francis Academy in Hankinson, North Dakota. After the academy closed, the building was renovated and continues to operate as a conference and retreat center.
