= Grafrath =

- Municipality
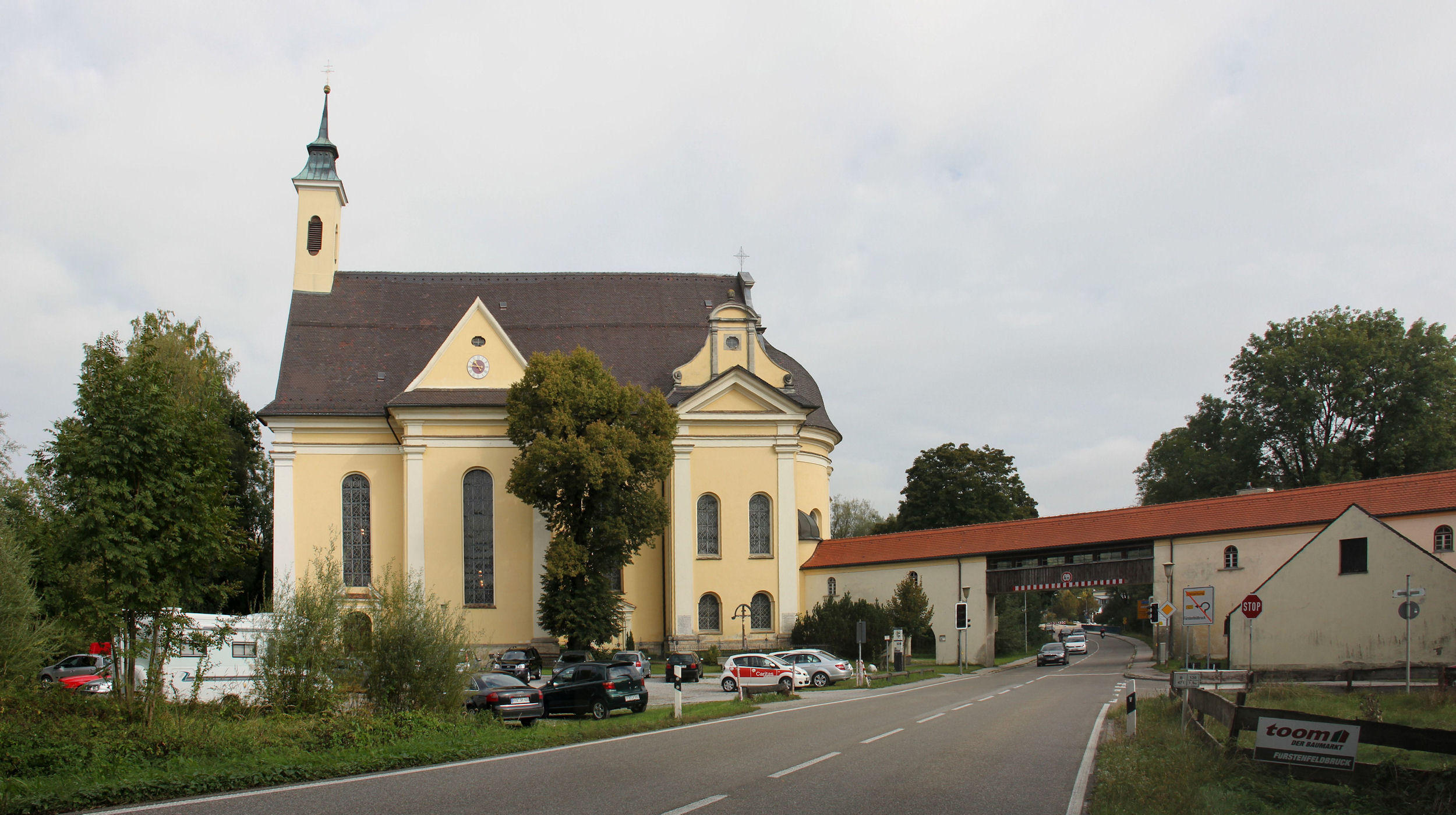
- Saint Rasso church

- Coat of arms

- Location of Grafrath within Fürstenfeldbruck district
- Interactive map of Grafrath
- Location within Germany Location within Bavaria
- Coordinates: 48°07′N 11°10′E
- Country: Germany
- State: Bavaria
- Admin. region: Oberbayern
- District: Fürstenfeldbruck
- Municipal assoc.: Grafrath
- Subdivisions: 3 Ortsteile

Government
  - Mayor (2020–26): Markus Kennerknecht

Area
  - Total: 14.43 km^{2} (5.57 sq mi)
- Elevation: 550 m (1,800 ft)

Population (2025-12-31)
  - Total: 3,866
  - Density: 267.9/km^{2} (693.9/sq mi)
- Time zone: UTC+01:00 (CET)
  - Summer (DST): UTC+02:00 (CEST)
- Postal codes: 82284
- Dialling codes: 08144
- Vehicle registration: FFB
- Website: www.grafrath.de

Grafrath (German pronunciation: [ˈɡʁaːfʁaːt]) is a municipality in the district of Fürstenfeldbruck in Bavaria in Germany. It takes its name from Saint Rasso (Ratho), a count (Graf) who founded a Benedictine abbey in the 10th century, and which existed until 1803.

== Points of interest ==
- Forstlicher Versuchsgarten Grafrath, an arboretum
