= Andechs =

- Municipality
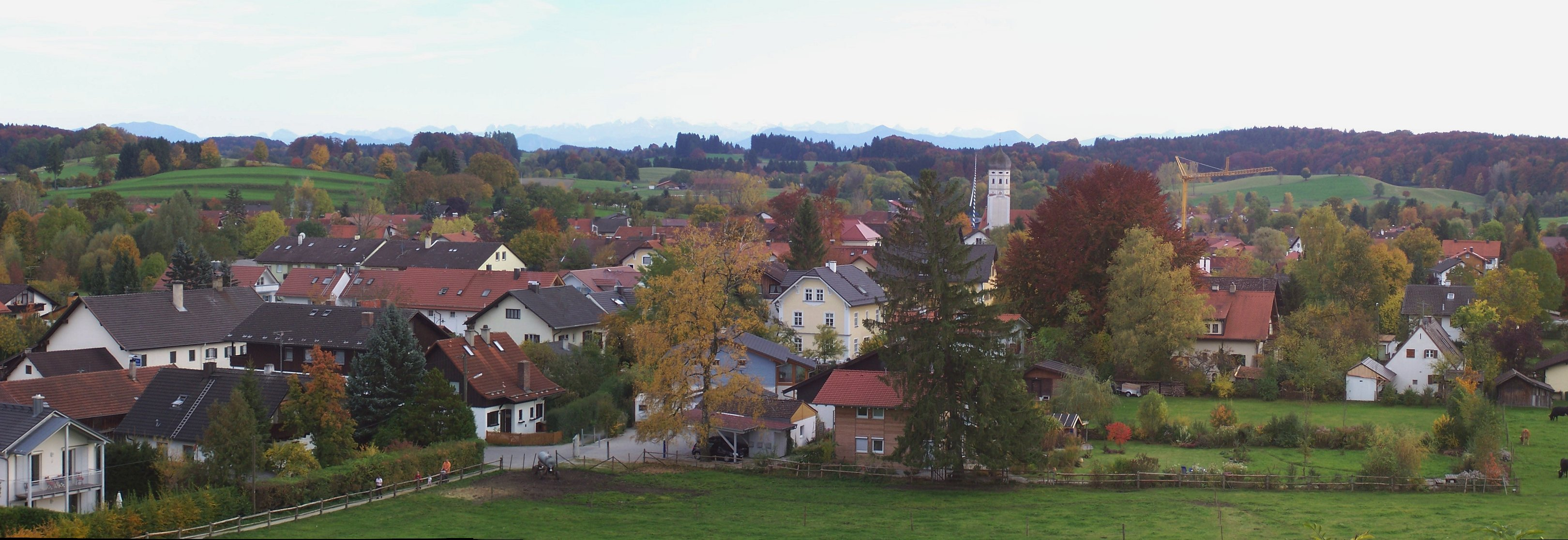

- Coat of arms

- Location of Andechs within Starnberg district
- Interactive map of Andechs
- Location within Germany Location within Bavaria
- Coordinates: 47°58′0″N 11°11′5″E
- Country: Germany
- State: Bavaria
- Admin. region: Oberbayern
- District: Starnberg
- Subdivisions: 4 Ortsteile

Government
  - Mayor (2020–26): Georg Scheitz (CSU)

Area
  - Total: 40.43 km^{2} (15.61 sq mi)
- Elevation: 690 m (2,260 ft)

Population (2025-12-31)
  - Total: 3,798
  - Density: 93.94/km^{2} (243.3/sq mi)
- Time zone: UTC+01:00 (CET)
  - Summer (DST): UTC+02:00 (CEST)
- Postal codes: 82346
- Dialling codes: 08152
- Vehicle registration: STA
- Website: www.gemeinde-andechs.de

Andechs (German pronunciation: [ˈandɛks]) is a municipality in the district of Starnberg in Bavaria in Germany. It is renowned in Germany and beyond for Andechs Abbey, a Benedictine monastery that has brewed beer since 1455. The monastery brewery offers tours to visitors.

The 20th century German composer Carl Orff is buried in the chapel of Andechs Abbey.

This town was the capital of one of the States of the Counts of Andechs.
