= Theresa Benedicta of Bavaria =

Princess of Bavaria

Theresia Benedikta of Bayern
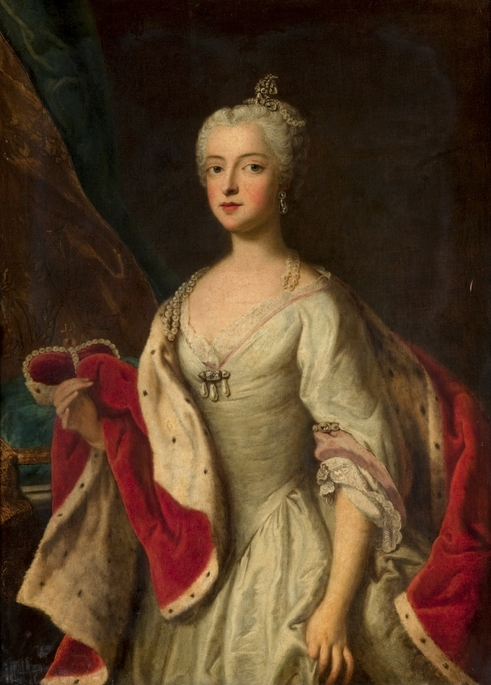
- Portrait by George Desmarées, before 1743.
- Born: 6 December 1725; Nymphenburg Palace, Munich
- Died: 29 March 1743 (aged 17); Frankfurt
Names
- Theresiae Benedictae Mariae Barbarae Antoniae Walburgae Nicolinae Felicitatis
- House: Wittelsbach
- Father: Charles VII, Holy Roman Emperor
- Mother: Maria Amalia of Austria

Theresia Benedikta of Bavaria (Theresia Benedikta Barbara Antonia Walburga Nicolina Fecilitas) ; 6 December 1725 – 29 March 1743) was a Princess of Bavaria.

== Biography ==
Theresia Benedikta was the third child of Charles Albert, Elector of Bavaria and Holy Roman Emperor. Her mother, Maria Amalia, was an Archduchess of Austria by birth.

Her maternal grandparents were Joseph I, Holy Roman Emperor, and Wilhelmina Amalia of Brunswick-Lüneburg. Her paternal grandparents were Maximilian II Emanuel, Elector of Bavaria, and Theresa Kunegunda Sobieska, the daughter of the King of Polish–Lithuanian Commonwealth, John III Sobieski. Theresia’s mother, Archduchess Maria Amalia, was also a first cousin of Empress Maria Theresa.

Her mother gave birth to seven children, only four of whom lived through to adulthood. Theresa Benedicta's siblings included her brother Maximilian III, Elector of Bavaria, and two sisters Maria Antonia, Electress of Saxony, and Maria Anna Josepha, Margravine of Baden-Baden.

== Death ==
Princess Theresa Benedicta died on 29 March 1743 in Frankfurt at age 17 of either smallpox or chicken pox, during her father's reign as Holy Roman Emperor. The funeral oration for Theresa Benedicta was printed immediately after her death in 1743.

Her body was buried in the St. Michael's Church, Munich, Electorate of Bavaria.

== Ancestry ==
Ancestors of Theresa Benedicta of Bavaria

8. Ferdinand Maria, Elector of Bavaria
4. Maximilian II Emanuel, Elector of Bavaria
9. Henriette Adelaide of Savoy
2. Charles VII, Holy Roman Emperor
10. John III Sobieski
5. Theresa Kunegunda Sobieska
11. Marie Casimire Louise de la Grange d'Arquien
1. Theresa Benedicta of Bavaria
12. Leopold I, Holy Roman Emperor
6. Joseph I, Holy Roman Emperor
13. Eleonore-Magdalena of Pfalz-Neuburg
3. Maria Amalia of Austria
14. John Frederick, Duke of Brunswick-Lüneburg
7. Wilhelmine Amalie of Brunswick-Lüneburg
15. Benedicta Henrietta of the Palatinate
