= 1745 imperial election =

Election in the Holy Roman Empire

- 13 September 1745

7 Prince-electors (Note: Two electors, Frederick II of Brandenburg and Charles Theodore of the Palatinate, abstained from the ballot.) 5 votes needed to win (Note: Five votes were required to establish an absolute majority of the nine recognized electoral seats.)
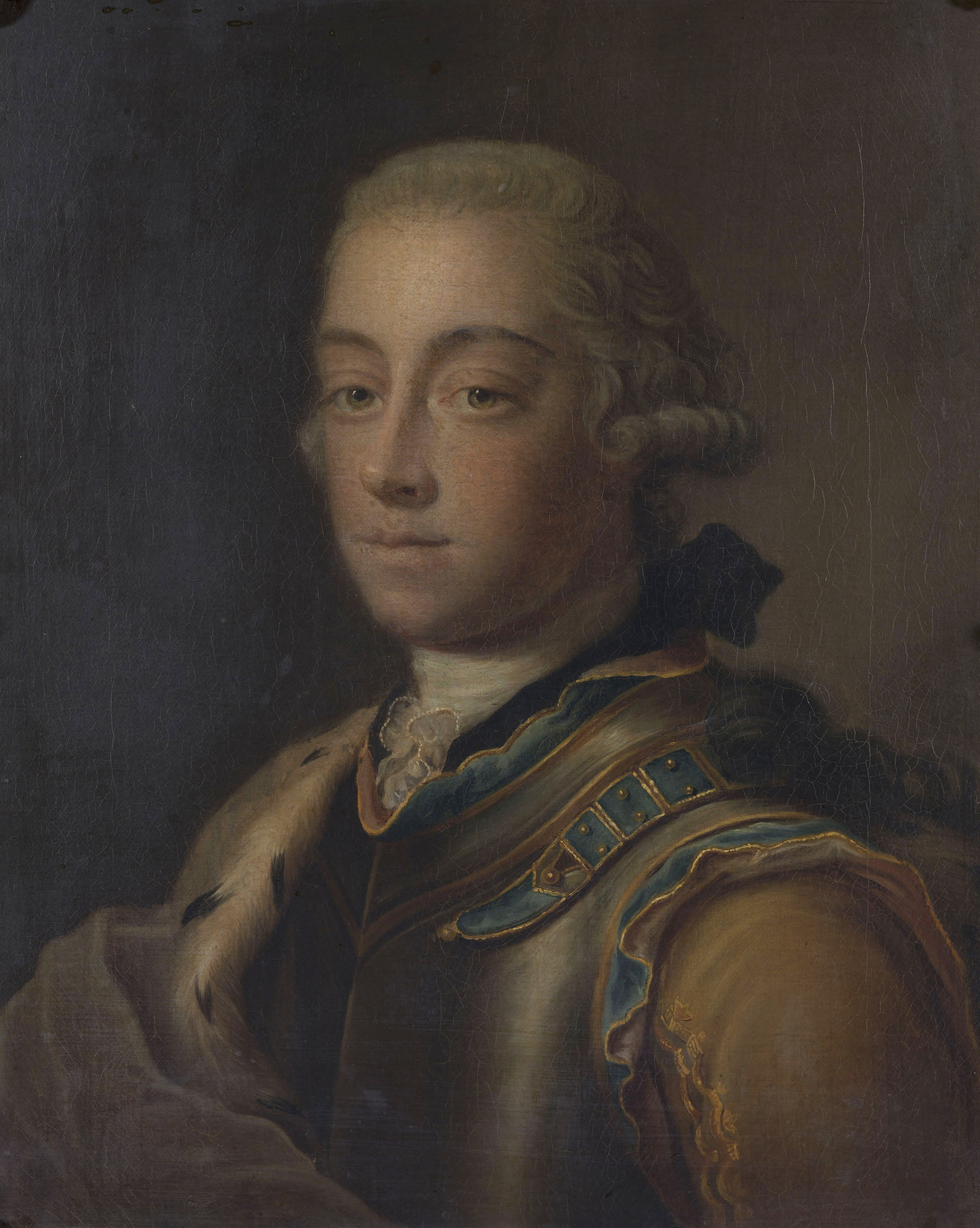
Candidate	Francis Stephen
House	Habsburg-Lorraine
Electoral vote	7
Percentage	100%
Emperor before election
Charles VII
House of Wittelsbach
Elected Emperor
Francis I
House of Habsburg-Lorraine

The 1745 imperial election was held on (13 September 1745) in Frankfurt am Main to elect the new Holy Roman Emperor following the death of Emperor Charles VII. Francis Stephen of Lorraine was elected, restoring the Habsburg dynasty to the imperial throne.

== Background ==
=== War of the Austrian Succession ===
Charles VI, Holy Roman Emperor died on October 20, 1740. His daughter Maria Theresa inherited his royal titles in Austria, Hungary, Croatia, Bohemia, Transylvania, Mantua, Milan, the Austrian Netherlands and Parma according to the terms of the Pragmatic Sanction of 1713.

Although Prussia had accepted the Pragmatic Sanction, it now repudiated Maria Theresa's inheritance as a violation of Salic law. Its king Frederick the Great invaded Silesia on December 16. France and Bavaria, whose elector Charles Albert rejected the Pragmatic Sanction for self-interested reasons, joined Prussia in 1741. Charles Albert's territories in Bavaria were quickly overrun by the Austrian forces of Maria Theresa, but the alliance remained on the attack. On November 26, Prague was captured and on December 9, Charles Albert crowned himself king of Bohemia. On January 24, 1742, in the imperial election of 1742, from which Maria Theresa was excluded, he was elected Holy Roman Emperor as Charles VII.

He died of gout at Nymphenburg Palace on January 20, 1745, three years before the conclusion of the war.

=== Election of 1745 ===
The electors called to Frankfurt to choose Charles VII's successor were:

- Johann Friedrich Karl von Ostein, elector of Mainz
- Franz Georg von Schönborn, elector of Trier
- Clemens August, elector of Cologne
- Maria Theresa, queen regnant of Bohemia
- Maximilian III Joseph, elector of Bavaria
- Frederick Augustus II, elector of Saxony
- Frederick the Great, elector of Brandenburg
- Charles Theodore, elector of the Palatinate
- George II of Great Britain, elector of Hanover

Maria Theresa came to an arrangement with Maximilian III Joseph, Charles VII's son, wherein she would allow his return to Bavaria in exchange for his support, and the support of his uncle Clemens August, of the candidacy of her husband, Francis of Lorraine.

== Election results ==
Francis was elected Emperor Francis I with the support of seven of the electors. Frederick the Great and Charles Theodore, opponents of Maria Theresa in the War of the Austrian Succession, abstained. Francis was crowned on 4 October 1745 at St. Bartholomew’s Cathedral in Frankfurt. His accession reinstated Habsburg dynastic dominance, though actual governance remained firmly in Maria Theresa’s hands. Frederick II eventually recognized the election’s validity on 25 December 1745.

Elector	Title	Vote
Johann Friedrich Karl von Ostein	Archbishop of Mainz	Francis I
Franz Georg von Schönborn	Archbishop of Trier	Francis I
Clemens August of Bavaria	Archbishop of Cologne	Francis I
Maria Theresa	Queen of Bohemia	Francis I
Maximilian III Joseph, Elector of Bavaria	Elector of Bavaria	Francis I
Frederick Augustus II of Saxony	Elector of Saxony	Francis I
George II of Great Britain	Elector of Hanover	Francis I
Frederick II of Prussia	Elector of Brandenburg	Abstained
Charles Theodore, Elector Palatine	Elector Palatine	Abstained
Total		7 votes, 77.8% (Francis I), 2 abstentions (22.2%)
