= 1742 imperial election =

Election in the Holy Roman Empire

- 24 January 1742

8 Prince-electors (Note: The Bohemian electoral vote was excluded from the ballot because the succession to the Bohemian crown remained unsettled.) 5 votes needed to win
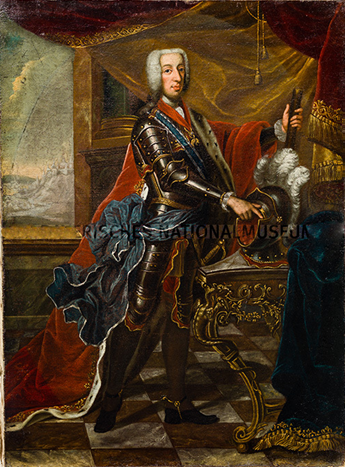

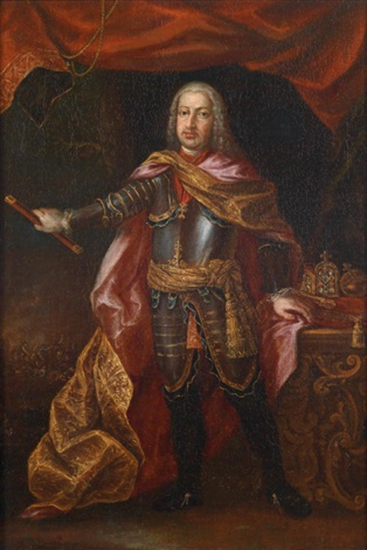
Candidate	Charles Albert	Francis Stephen
House	Wittelsbach	Habsburg-Lorraine
Electoral vote	8	0
Percentage	100%	0%
Emperor before election
Charles VI
House of Habsburg
Elected Emperor
Charles VII
House of Wittelsbach

The imperial election of 1742 was an imperial election held to select the emperor of the Holy Roman Empire. It took place in Frankfurt on 24 January. The result was the election of Charles Albert of Bavaria, the first non-Habsburg emperor in three hundred years.

== Background ==
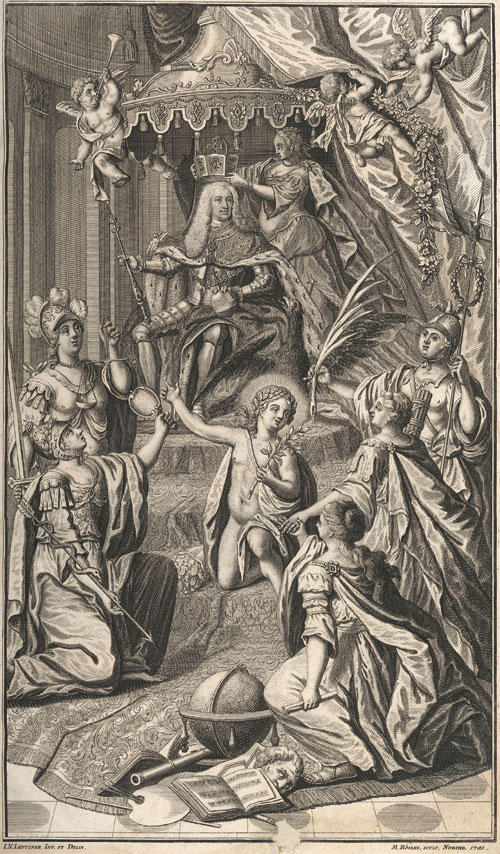
Allegorical depiction of the 1742 coronation

=== War of the Spanish Succession ===
On 3 October 1700, weeks before his death, the childless and severely disabled Charles II of Spain named Philip V of Spain, his sister's grandson and the grandson of the French king Louis XIV of France, heir to the entire Spanish Empire. The possession by the House of Bourbon of the French and Spanish thrones threatened the balance of power in Europe. England, Austria and the Dutch Republic, fearing this threat, resurrected the Grand Alliance in support of the claim of Archduke Charles, then a young man of fifteen. Leopold I, Holy Roman Emperor had married another sister of Charles II in 1666, and in 1685 their daughter surrendered her right to the Spanish throne to Archduke Charles, Leopold's son from a later marriage. The first hostilities of the War of the Spanish Succession broke out in June 1701. The Grand Alliance declared war on France in May 1702.

That same year, Maximilian II Emanuel, the elector of Bavaria, and his brother Joseph Clemens of Bavaria, the elector of Cologne, joined France in support of Philip's claim to the Spanish succession. They were quickly forced into flight and were deprived of their electorates by the Imperial Diet in 1706. Being under the Imperial Ban they could not participate in the imperial election of 1711, which elected Archduke Charles as Charles VI.

The War of the Spanish Succession was ended by the treaties of Utrecht, Rastatt and Baden. The last of these, signed on 7 September 1714, restored the territories and electorates of Maximilian Emanuel and Joseph Clemens. Charles VI renounced his claim to the Spanish throne to Philip.

=== The campaign of Charles VI ===
In his later years, Charles VI tried to secure the election of his son-in-law, Francis Duke of Lorraine, as his successor. He was opposed in these efforts by Charles Albert, elector of Bavaria. Charles Albert believed that he had a better claim, as he was a son-in-law of Charles VI's older brother Joseph I, Holy Roman Emperor and a great-great-great-grandson of Ferdinand II, Holy Roman Emperor. Nevertheless, Francis tended to have greater support.

Charles VI died on 20 October 1740. Maria Theresa, his daughter and Francis of Lorraine's wife, inherited his royal titles in Austria, Hungary, Croatia, Bohemia, Transylvania, Mantua, Milan, the Austrian Netherlands and Parma, according to the terms of the Pragmatic Sanction of 1713.

=== War of the Austrian Succession ===
Although Prussia had accepted the Pragmatic Sanction, it now repudiated Maria Theresa's inheritance as a violation of Salic law. Its king Frederick the Great invaded Silesia on 16 December. France and Bavaria joined Prussia in 1741, and on 26 November they captured Prague. On 9 December Charles Albert crowned himself King of Bohemia.

=== Election of 1742 ===
The electors called to Frankfurt the next month to elect the successor of Charles VI were:

- Philipp Karl von Eltz-Kempenich, elector of Mainz
- Franz Georg von Schönborn, elector of Trier
- Clemens August of Bavaria, elector of Cologne
- Charles Albert, elector of Bavaria and claimant to the Kingdom of Bohemia
- Frederick Augustus II, elector of Saxony
- Frederick the Great, elector of Brandenburg
- Charles III Philip, elector of the Electoral Palatinate
- George II of Great Britain, elector of Hanover

Clemens August was the brother of Charles Albert and Charles III Philip his cousin. Francis of Lorraine was supported by not only his wife, Maria Theresa, who claimed to be queen regnant of Bohemia, but also the electors of Mainz, Trier, and Hanover.

== Election results ==
Elector	Title	Vote
Johann Friedrich Karl von Ostein	Archbishop of Mainz	Charles Albert
Franz Georg von Schönborn	Archbishop of Trier	Charles Albert
Clemens August of Bavaria	Archbishop of Cologne	Charles Albert
Charles Albert	Elector of Bavaria	Charles Albert
Karl III Philipp	Elector Palatine	Charles Albert
Frederick Augustus II of Saxony	Elector of Saxony	Charles Albert
George II of Great Britain	Elector of Hanover	Charles Albert
Frederick II of Prussia	Elector of Brandenburg	Charles Albert
Total		Charles Albert unanimously elected with 8 votes (100 %). 0 votes for Francis Stephen

The electors of Brandenburg and Saxony remained uncommitted, but were wooed by the French to support Charles Albert. Charles Albert won an additional advantage when he was able to secure the exclusion of Maria Theresa from the election, on the grounds that the succession to Bohemia remained unsettled. With the three votes of the House of Wittelsbach and the support of the electorates of Saxony and Brandenburg, his election seemed inevitable. The other three electors acquiesced. Charles Albert was elected and crowned at Frankfurt on 12 February as Charles VII, the first non-Habsburg to be elected in some three hundred years. At the same time his capital, Munich was occupied by Habsburg troops.

== Aftermath ==
The election of Charles Albert of Bavaria as Holy Roman Emperor marked the first time since 1438 that a non-Habsburg had ascended to the imperial throne. His election was largely enabled by the ongoing War of the Austrian Succession and the contested legitimacy of Maria Theresa's right to inherit the Habsburg domains under the Pragmatic Sanction of 1713.

Despite winning the imperial crown, Charles Albert's reign as Charles VII was troubled from the outset. His home territory of Bavaria was occupied by Austrian troops shortly after his coronation, and he spent much of his reign in exile. Maria Theresa refused to recognize his legitimacy and continued to press her own claims, both to her hereditary lands and indirectly through her husband, Francis Stephen of Lorraine, as a rival imperial candidate.

Charles VII was crowned Emperor in Frankfurt on 12 February 1742, but his authority was limited and contested. He ruled largely in name only, dependent on French military support and lacking control over key imperial territories. His brief reign ended with his death on 20 January 1745.

Following Charles VII’s death, his son, Elector Maximilian III Joseph made peace with Maria Theresa, effectively conceding the imperial cause. This paved the way for the election of Francis Stephen in the 1745 imperial election, restoring the imperial crown to the Habsburgs through the newly formed House of Habsburg-Lorraine.
