= Maximilian III =

Maximilian III may refer to:

- Maximilian III, Archduke of Austria (1558–1618)
- Maximilian III Joseph, Elector of Bavaria (1727–1777)
