= Maria Amalia, Holy Roman Empress =

Holy Roman Empress from 1742 to 1745

Maria Amalia of Austria
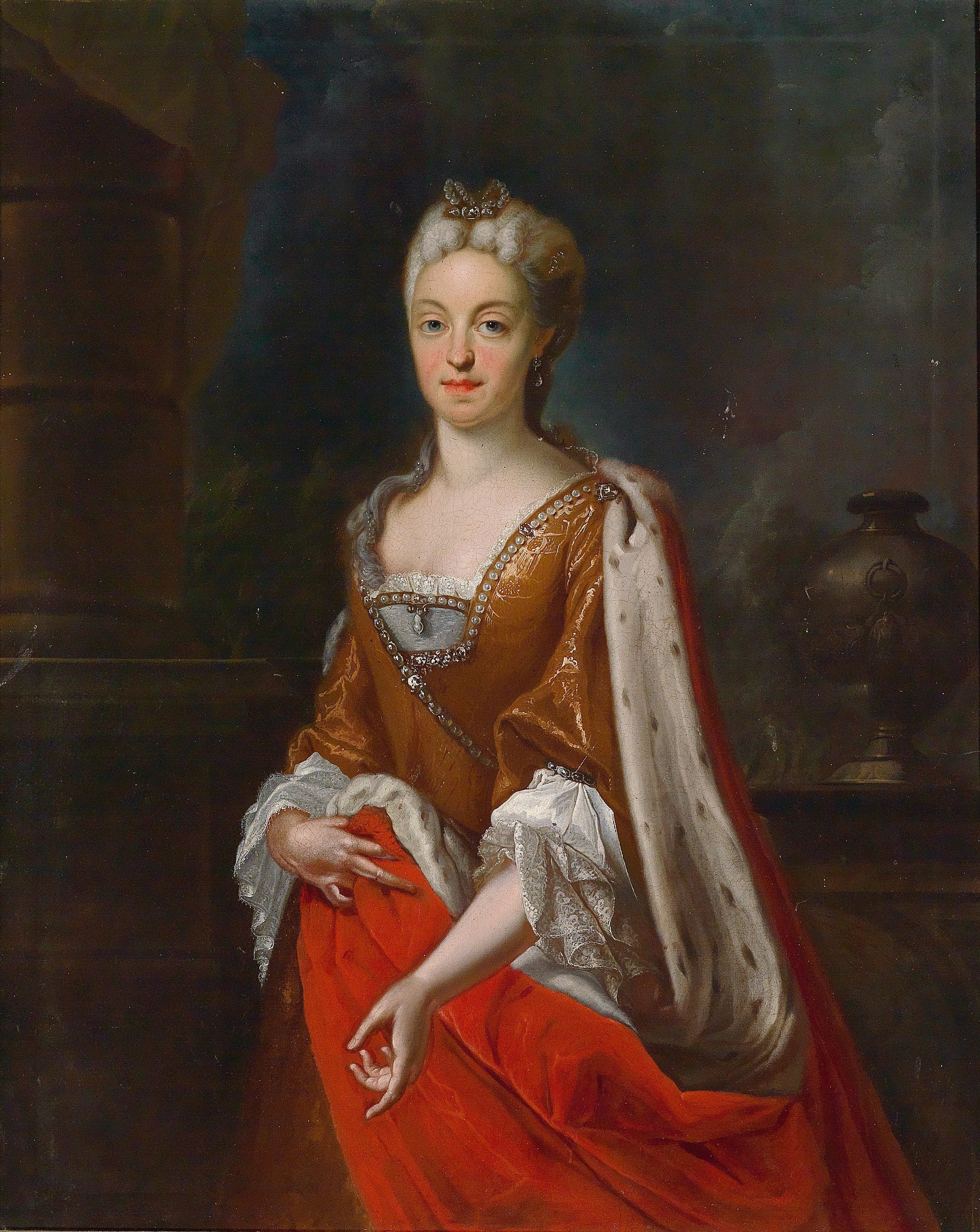
- Portrait by Joseph Vivien

Holy Roman Empress Queen consort of Germany
- Tenure: 12 February 1742 – 20 January 1745

Queen consort of Bohemia
- Tenure: 9 December 1741–1743

Electress consort of Bavaria
- Tenure: 26 February 1726 – 20 January 1745
- Born: 22 October 1701; Hofburg Palace, Vienna, Archduchy of Austria, Holy Roman Empire
- Died: 11 December 1756 (aged 55); Nymphenburg Palace, Munich, Electorate of Bavaria, Holy Roman Empire
- Burial: Theatine Church
- Spouse: Charles VII, Holy Roman Emperor (m. 1722; died 1745)
- Issue: Maria Antonia, Electress of Saxony; Theresa Benedicta; Maximilian III Joseph, Elector of Bavaria; Maria Anna, Margravine of Baden-Baden; Maria Josepha, Holy Roman Empress
Names
- Maria Amalie Josefa Anna
- House: Habsburg
- Father: Joseph I, Holy Roman Emperor
- Mother: Wilhelmine Amalia of Brunswick-Lüneburg

Maria Amalia of Austria (German: Maria Amalia Josefa Anna; 22 October 1701 – 11 December 1756) was Holy Roman empress, queen of Bohemia, and electress of Bavaria among many other titles as the spouse of Emperor Charles VII. By birth, she was an archduchess of Austria as the daughter of Emperor Joseph I. One of her children was Maximilian III Joseph, Elector of Bavaria.

== Biography ==
=== Early life ===
Maria Amalia was born on 22 October 1701 in the Hofburg in Vienna eleven weeks after the death of her infant brother Leopold Joseph, her parents' only son. Her mother, Wilhelmine Amalia of Brunswick-Lüneburg, was unable to conceive more children after her, supposedly because her father had contracted syphilis and passed it onto his wife, rendering her infertile.

Maria Amalia and her elder sister, Maria Josepha were both given a very strict Catholic upbringing by their mother, but Maria Amalia was described as having a more vivid and extroverted personality than her sister.

When Maria Amalia was nine years old, her father died of smallpox and was succeeded by his brother Charles VI. During the reign of Maria Amalia's grandfather Leopold I, his two sons, the future Joseph I and Charles VI signed the Mutual Pact of Succession, which gave Joseph's daughters precedence in the order of succession over Charles' daughters (if neither had sons). Charles replaced this with the Pragmatic Sanction of 1713. This put Maria Amalia and her elder sister Maria Josepha behind his own future daughters, the first of whom, Maria Theresa, would be born in 1717. The displaced archduchesses were not allowed to marry until they renounced their rights to the throne.

=== Marriage ===
Maria Amalia was proposed as a bride for Victor Amadeus, Prince of Piedmont, heir to the Kingdom of Sicily and the Duchy of Savoy in the hope that the union would create better relations between Savoy and Austria. However, the prince's father, King Victor Amadeus II did not agree to the plan, and the suggested groom died of smallpox in 1715.

In 1717, Maria Amalia met her future spouse, Charles Albert, Hereditary Prince of Bavaria, when he visited Vienna on his way to participate in the Siege of Belgrade. Charles Albert used his time in the city become acquainted with the imperial family, wishing to marry into the House of Habsburg for dynastic and economic reasons. They met for a second time in 1718. Charles Albert initially asked to marry her elder sister, Maria Josepha, but she was already engaged.

After she had recognised the Pragmatic Sanction and effectively renounced her right to the throne, Maria Amalia married Charles Albert on 5 October 1722 in Vienna. She received a great dowry, including jewelry worth 986 500 guilders. The opera I veri amici, 'The True Friends' by Tomaso Albinoni was performed at the wedding, but the wedding was not celebrated as much in Vienna as it would be in Munich, where festivities lasted from 17 October to 4 November.

The couple lived in the Nymphenburg Palace in Munich and had seven children. In May 1727, after the birth of the heir, Maximilian Joseph, Maria Amalia was gifted the Fürstenried Palace as her own residence. In 1734, Charles Albert named the Amalienburg in the Nymphenburg Palace Park after her. Their relationship was described as a moderately happy one despite Charles Albert's infidelity and illegitimate children, as they had similar personalities and interests. They both enjoyed court life, pomp, and festivals, made the Bavarian court a cultural center together. Maria Amalia liked operas and her apartments are regarded as a notable example of Rococo interior design. She was interested in politics, had a passion for hunting, and liked to travel, arguing that pilgrimages would help her have sons. She supported churches and convents and had a close relationship with her sister-in-law Maria Anna Karolina, a Poor Clare.

Despite the fact that Maria Amalia had renounced her claims to the Habsburg monarchy upon her marriage, Charles Albert claimed them in her name during the War of the Austrian Succession after her uncle, Charles VI died. After an agreement with King Augustus III of Poland, the husband of her elder sister Maria Josepha (who would otherwise have a stronger claim), her husband invaded Bohemia. Maria Amalia was crowned queen of Bohemia in Prague on 7 December 1741. On 12 February 1742, she became Holy Roman empress following her husband's coronation as emperor in Frankfurt. On 14 February 1742, Bavaria was occupied by Austria.

=== Death ===
Maria Amalia's husband died on 20 January 1745 and was buried at the Theatine Church in Munich. She persuaded her son, the new elector, Maximilian, to make peace with her cousin Maria Theresa. As a widow, she mainly resided at Fürstenried Palace. In 1754, she started the first modern hospital in the city, managed by nuns of the Order of Saint Elisabeth who she had invited to found a convent.

Maria Amalia died in Munich in the Nymphenburg Palace on 11 December 1756, aged fifty-five. There is an anecdote concerning her remains, recounted by Giacomo Casanova in his Histoire de ma vie ('Story of My Life'). When he arrived in Munich, he was told that there was a miracle, talk of the whole city. 'The Empress, [...] the widow of Charles VII, whose body is still exposed to public view, has warm feet though she is dead', a priest told him, suggesting that he see the 'wonder' for himself. 'Most eager' to be able to 'boast' about witnessing a miracle, Casanova went there. The corpse 'did indeed have warm feet, but it was because of a hot stove which stood very near her defunct Imperial Majesty'.

== Issue ==
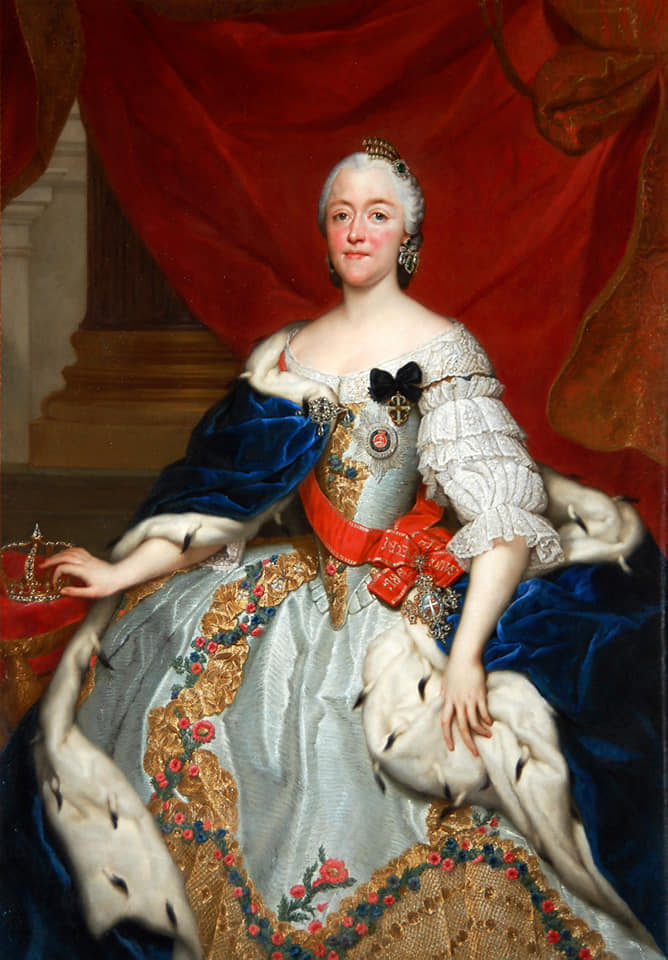
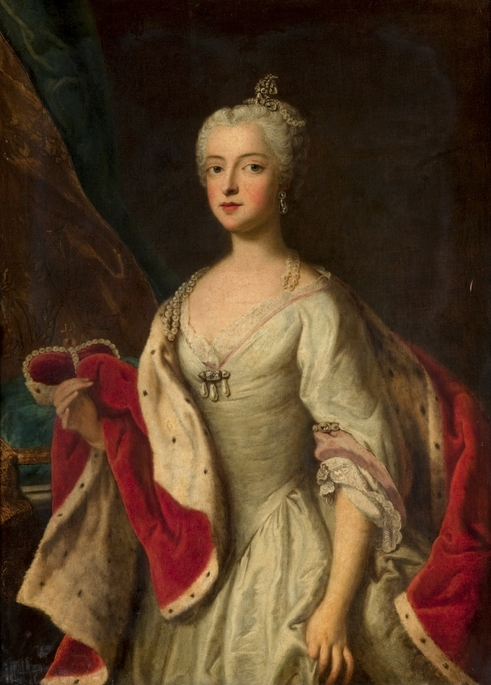
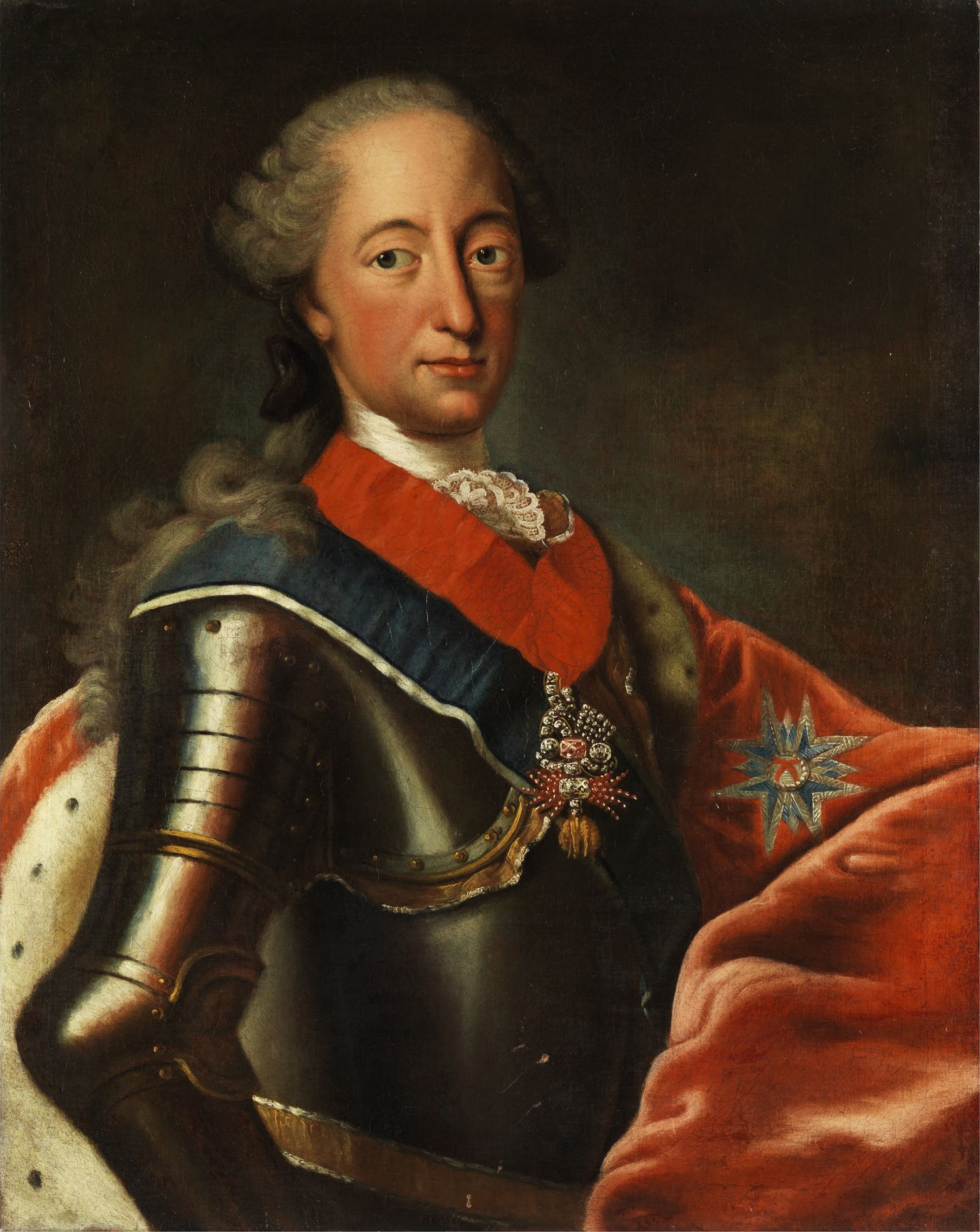
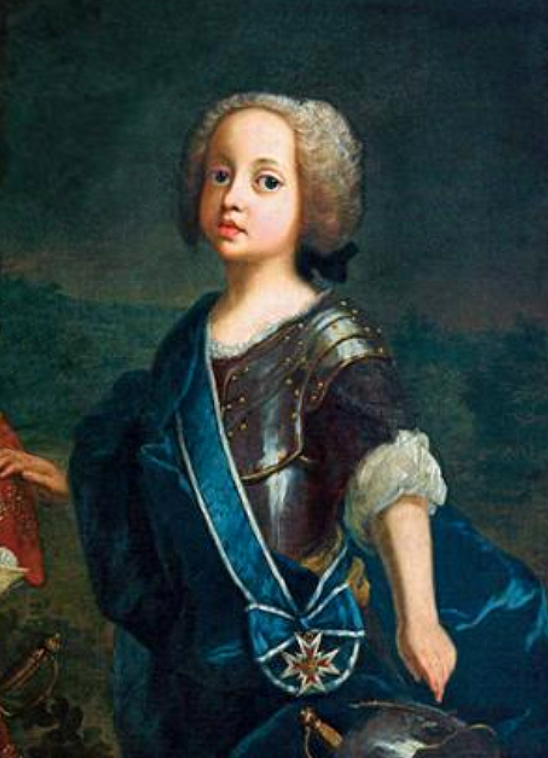
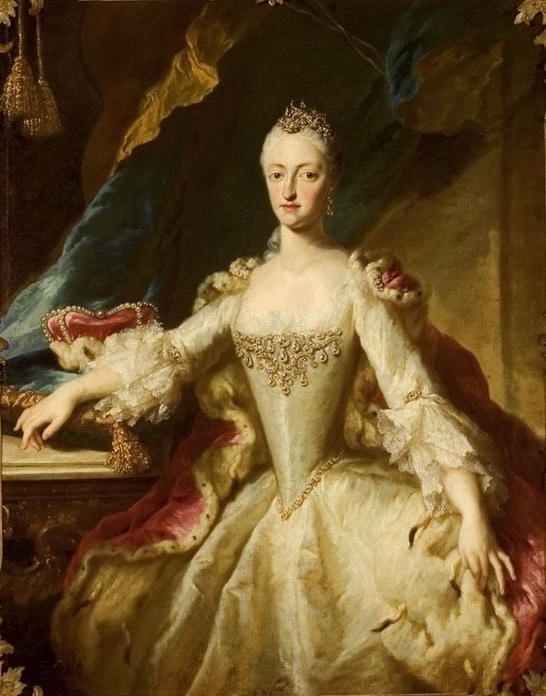
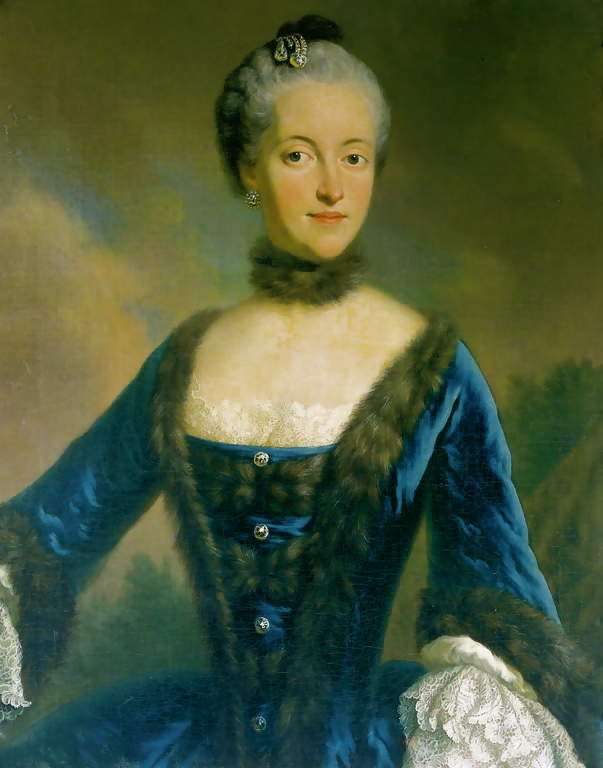
Name	Portrait	Birth	Death	Notes
Princess Maximiliana Maria of Bavaria		12 April 1723		Died in infancy.
Maria Antonia Walpurgis Symphorosa, Electress of Saxony		18 July 1724	23 April 1780	Composer; married in 1747 Frederick Christian of Saxony, had issue.
Princess Theresa Benedicta Maria of Bavaria		6 December 1725	29 March 1743	Died young and unmarried.
Maximilian III Joseph; Elector of Bavaria		28 March 1727	30 December 1777	Married in 1747 Maria Anna Sophia of Saxony, no issue.
Prince Joseph Ludvig Leopold of Bavaria		25 August 1728	2 December 1733	Died in childhood.
Maria Anna Josepha, Margravine of Baden-Baden		7 August 1734	7 May 1776	Married in 1755 Louis George, Margrave of Baden-Baden, no issue.
Maria Josepha Antonia; Holy Roman Empress		30 March 1739	28 May 1767	Married in 1765 her second cousin Joseph II, Holy Roman Emperor, no issue.

== Ancestry ==
Ancestors of Maria Amalia, Holy Roman Empress

8. Ferdinand III, Holy Roman Emperor
4. Leopold I, Holy Roman Emperor
9. Maria Anna of Spain
2. Joseph I, Holy Roman Emperor
10. Philipp Wilhelm, Elector Palatine
5. Eleonore-Magdalena of Neuburg
11. Elisabeth Amalie of Hesse-Darmstadt
1. Maria Amalia of Austria
12. George, Duke of Brunswick-Lüneburg
6. John Frederick, Duke of Brunswick-Lüneburg
13. Anne Eleonore of Hesse-Darmstadt
3. Wilhelmine Amalia of Brunswick-Lüneburg
14. Edward, Count Palatine of Simmern
7. Benedicta Henrietta of the Palatinate
15. Anna Gonzaga

German royalty
Preceded by Theresa Kunegunda Sobieska	Electress consort of Bavaria; 1726–1745	Succeeded by Maria Anna of Saxony
Preceded by Elisabeth Christine of Brunswick	Holy Roman Empress; German Queen; 1742–1745	Succeeded by Maria Theresa of Austria
Preceded by Elisabeth Christine of Brunswick	Queen consort of Bohemia; 1741–1743	Succeeded by Maria Luisa of Spain
