= Amalienburg =

18th century Rococo hunting lodge in Munich, Germany

Coordinates: 48°9′22″N 11°30′2″E

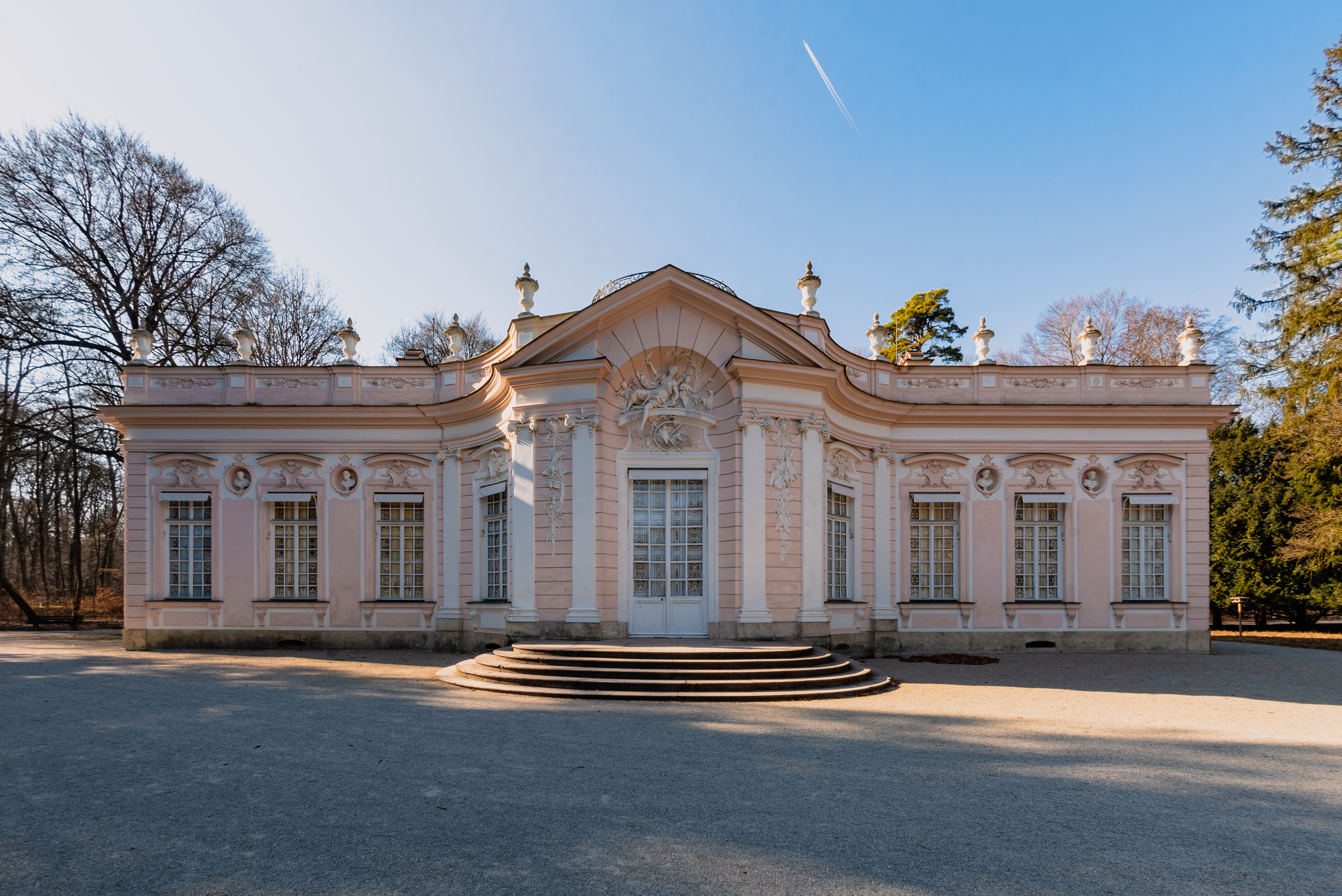
The exterior in 2023

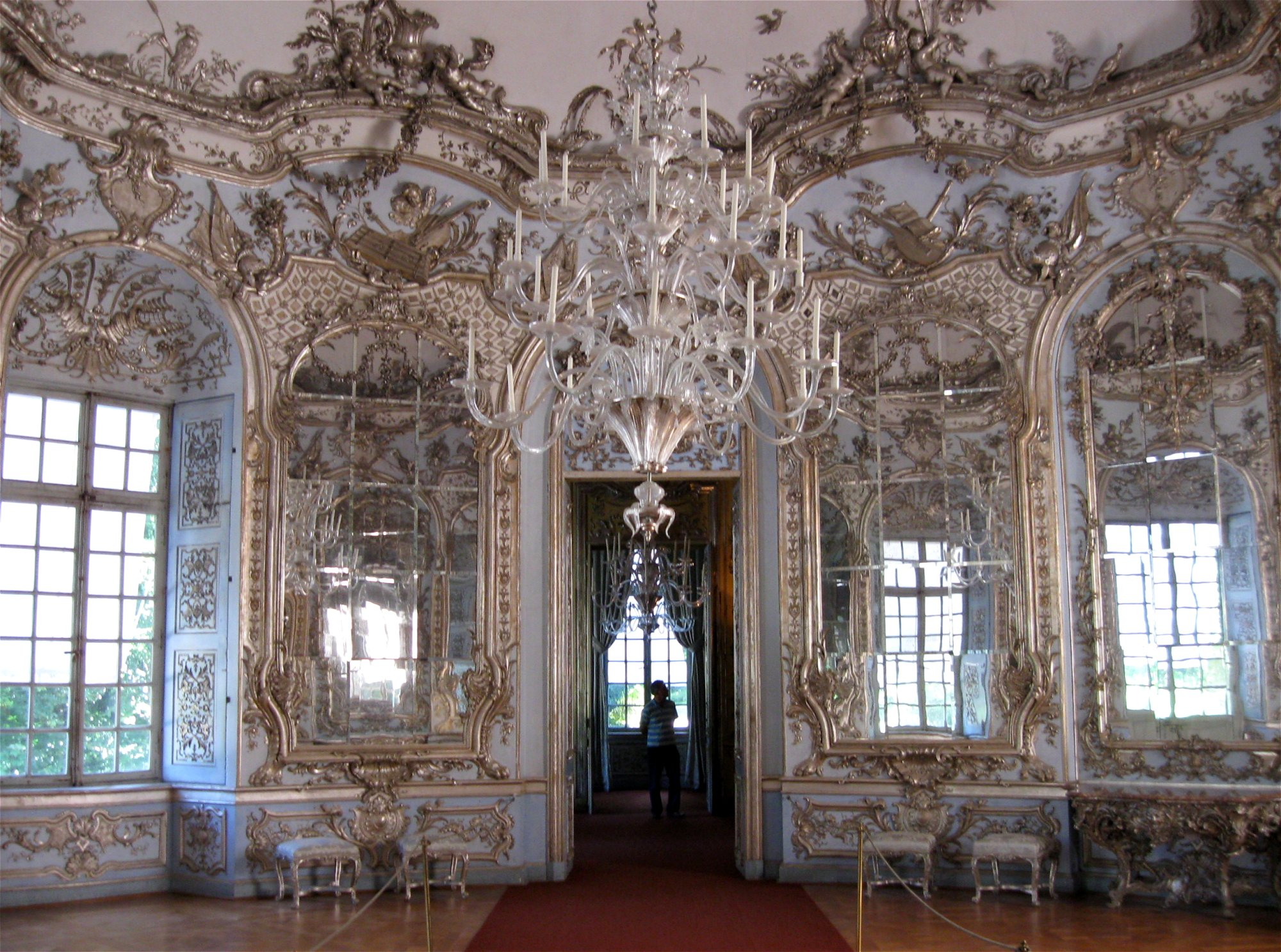
Interior, Hall of Mirrors

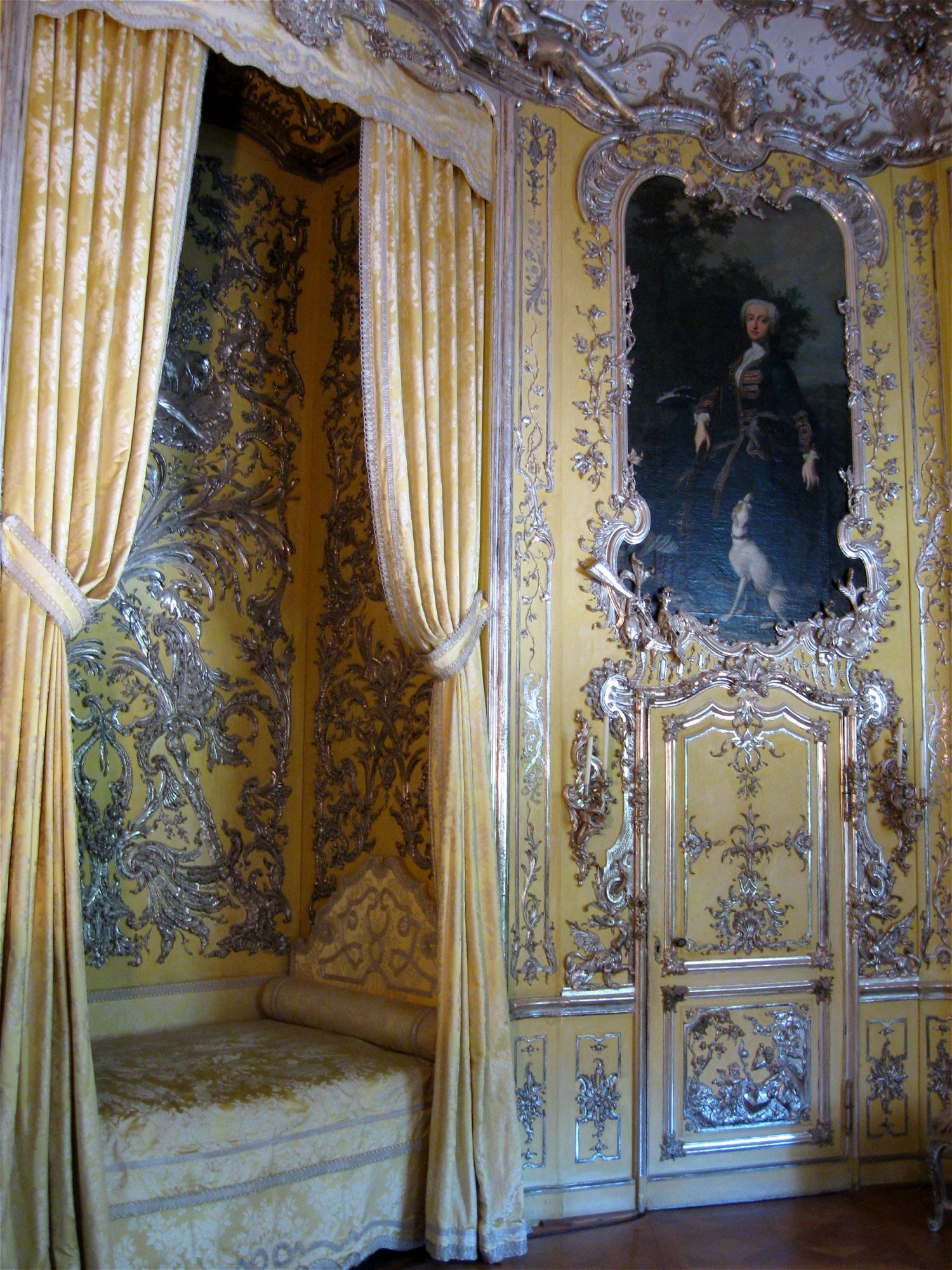
Interior, Rest Room

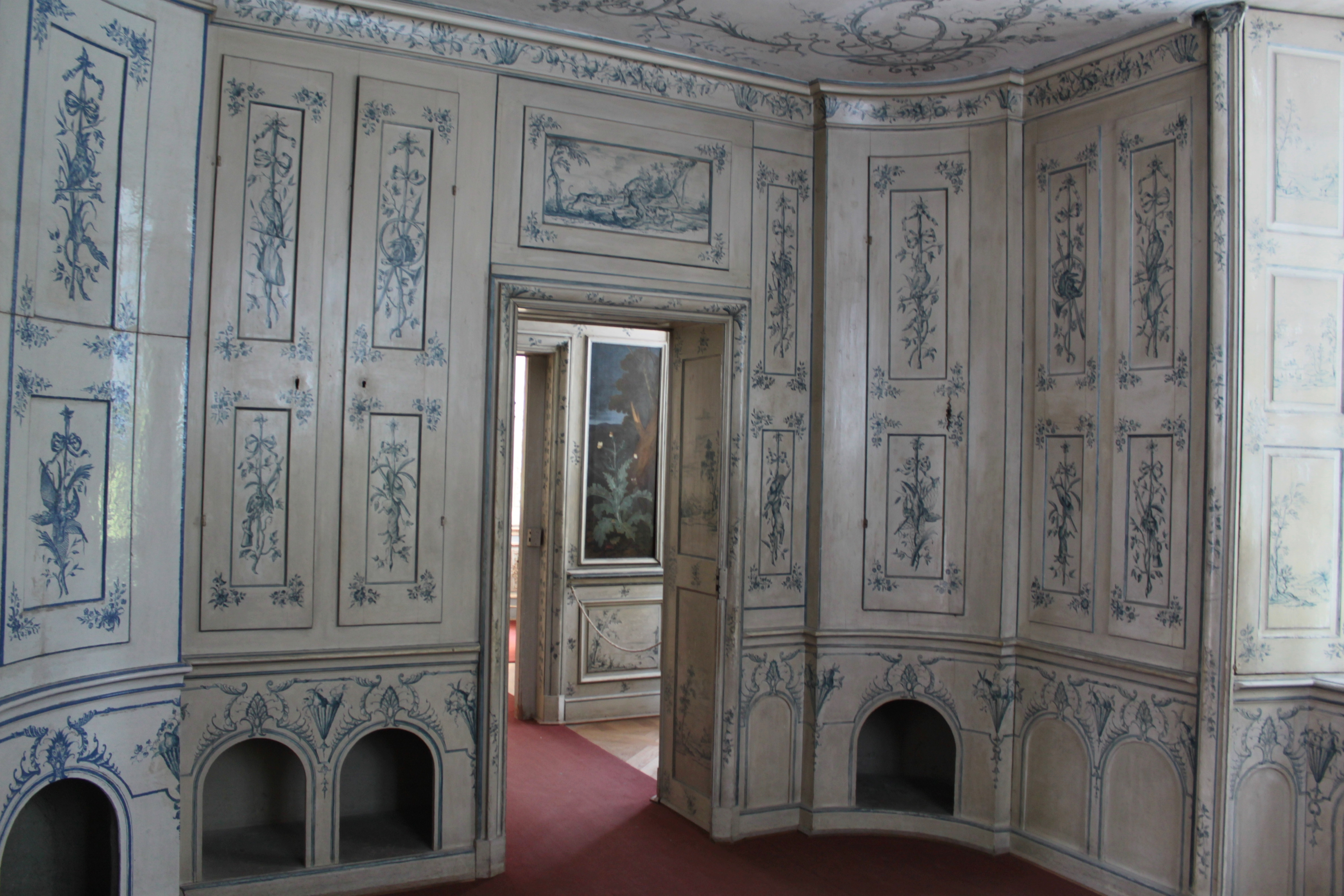
Interior, Blue Cabinet

The Amalienburg is an elaborate hunting lodge on the grounds of the Nymphenburg Palace Park, Munich, in southern Germany. It was designed by François de Cuvilliés in Rococo style and constructed between 1734 and 1739 for Elector Karl Albrecht and later Holy Roman Emperor Charles VII and his wife, Maria Amalia of Austria.

== Architecture ==
Most of the ground floor is given over to the round Hall of Mirrors in the center of the building; its mirrored walls reflect the park. It was designed by Johann Baptist Zimmermann and Joachim Dietrich (1690–1753). It creates an ethereal atmosphere in the Bavarian national colors of silver and blue.

In the south of the hall, the door leads to the electoral Rest Room and the Blue Cabinet, with access to the privy chamber. The Rest Room was the bedroom of the Electress, and the pavilion also accommodates an armoury and a kennel room for the hunting dogs in the Blue Cabinet.

North from the Hall of Mirrors is the entrance to the Pheasant Room and the Hunting Room. The Pheasant Room is bordering the kitchen. The kitchen is decorated with precious tiles from Delft which when being laid were mixed up by workers in the wrong order. The blue and white tiles in a Chinese style show flowers and birds. The Castrol stove (1735) built for the kitchen is a masonry construction with several fireholes covered by perforated iron plates. It is also known as a stew stove and was the first design that completely enclosed the fire.

In the central niche of the eastern facade is a stucco sculpture by Johann Baptist Zimmermann, representing a scene with the hunting goddess Diana. The presentation introduces the image program in all facilities of the building. The attic was derived from 1737, also manufactured to a design by Zimmermann, with decorative vases. These vases disappeared at an unknown date but were recreated in 1992 to a design by Hans Geiger: four adorn the entrance facade; twelve, the garden side of the Amalienburg.

A platform with ornate lattice, which is fitted to the building in the center of the roof, served as a raised hide for pheasant hunting: the birds were driven to the Amalienburg from the former pheasant (now menagerie) building. Since the castle could be supplied by the kitchen of Nymphenburg Palace, the Amalienburg lacks private farm buildings, unlike the other two park pavilions.

== See also ==
- List of Baroque residences
- 18th-century Western domes
- Nymphenburg Palace Park
