= Maria Josepha of Bavaria =

Holy Roman Empress from 1765 to 1767

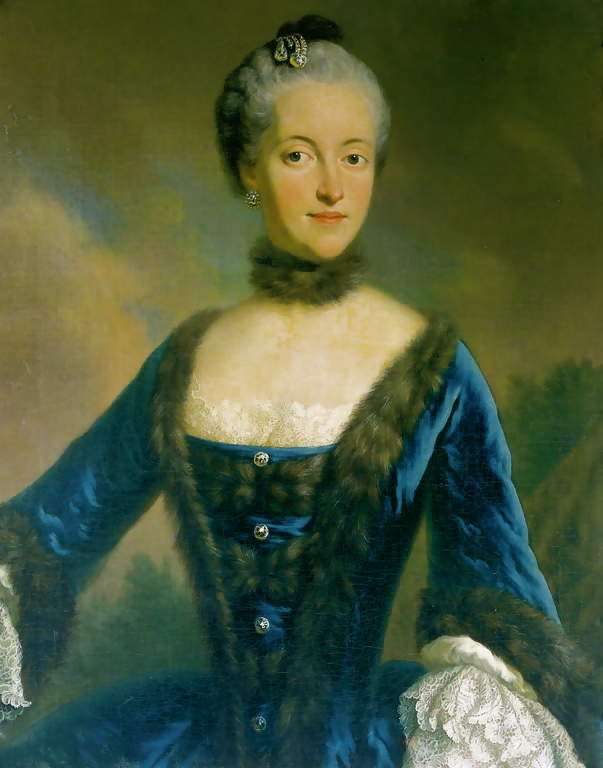
- Portrait by Martin van Meytens, c. 1765

Holy Roman Empress
- Tenure: 18 August 1765 – 28 May 1767

Queen consort of the Romans
- Tenure: 23 January 1765 – 18 August 1765
- Born: 20 March 1739; Munich, Electorate of Bavaria
- Died: 28 May 1767 (aged 28); Schönbrunn Palace, Vienna, Archduchy of Austria
- Burial: Imperial Crypt, Vienna
- Spouse: Joseph II, Holy Roman Emperor (m. 1765)
Names
- Maria Josepha Antonia Walburga Felicitas Regula
- House: Wittelsbach (by birth); Habsburg-Lorraine (by marriage)
- Father: Charles VII, Holy Roman Emperor
- Mother: Maria Amalia of Austria

Maria Josepha of Bavaria (20 March 1739 – 28 May 1767) was Holy Roman Empress, Queen of the Romans, Archduchess of Austria, and Grand Duchess of Tuscany, among other titles, by her marriage to Joseph II, Holy Roman Emperor. By birth, she was a Princess and Duchess of Bavaria as the daughter of Charles VII, Holy Roman Emperor, elector of Bavaria, and Archduchess Maria Amalia of Austria.

== Family and early life ==
Maria Josepha was born on 20 March 1739 in Munich, Bavaria. She was the seventh and youngest child of Charles Albert, Elector of Bavaria. Her mother, Maria Amalia, was an Archduchess of Austria by birth. Her maternal grandparents were Joseph I, Holy Roman Emperor, and Wilhelmina Amalia of Brunswick-Lüneburg. Her paternal grandparents were Maximilian II Emanuel, elector of Bavaria, and Theresa Kunegunda Sobieska, the daughter of the King of the Polish–Lithuanian Commonwealth, John III Sobieski. Josepha's mother, Archduchess Maria Amalia, was also a first cousin to her future mother-in-law, Empress Maria Theresa, and therefore Josepha was a second cousin to her future husband, Joseph, King of the Romans.

Josepha's mother, Archduchess Maria Amalia, gave birth to seven children, only four of whom lived through to adulthood. Maria Josepha's siblings included her brother Maximilian III, Elector of Bavaria, and two sisters Maria Antonia, Electress of Saxony, and Maria Anna Josepha, Margravine of Baden-Baden.

== Marriage and reign ==
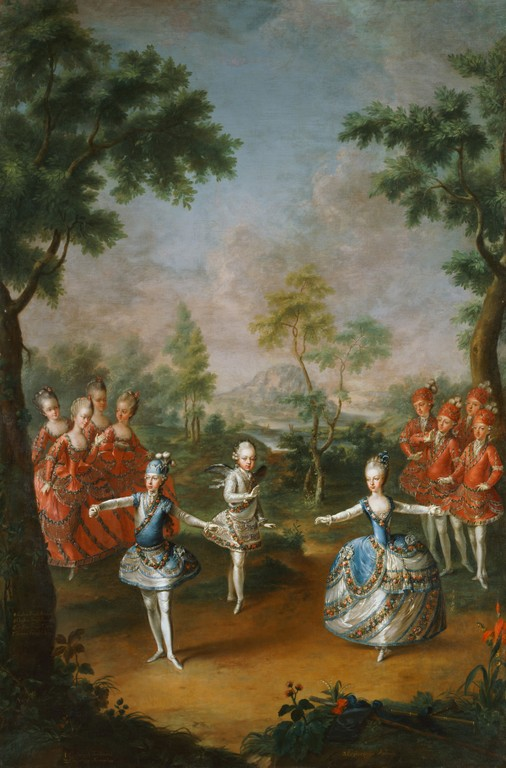
Fête organized to celebrate the marriage of Emperor Joseph II to Princess Maria Josepha of Bavaria, as seen in a painting by Georg Weikert, 1765

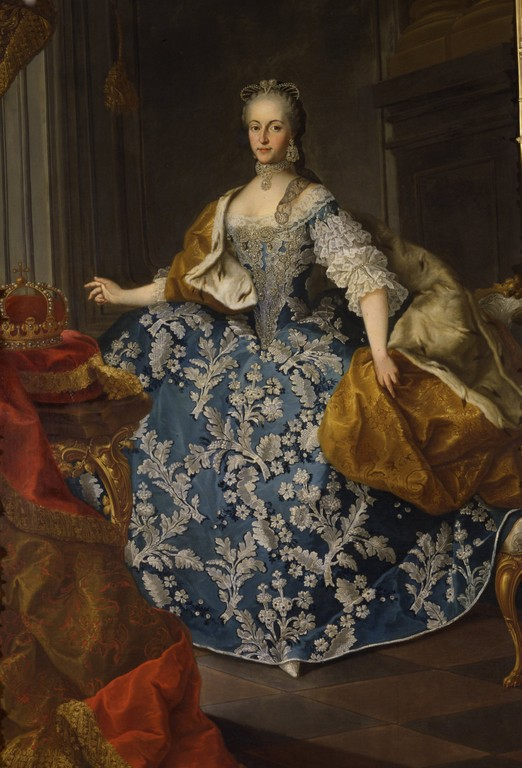
Portrait of Maria Josepha as Queen (by Martin van Meytens, 1765)

Maria Josepha was first married by proxy on 13 January 1765, to her second cousin, the widowed Joseph, King of the Romans, and heir of Empress Maria Theresa of Austria in Munich, Bavaria. Upon her arrival to Vienna from Munich, her husband did not seem to be dissatisfied with his new wife and neither did the entourage who greeted the princess. She and Joseph formally married on 25 January 1765, at the Schönbrunn Palace in Vienna, amidst suitable festivities. The marriage, however, was never happy; it had taken place only under pressure from Joseph's mother, Maria Theresa, who wanted her son to provide an heir to the throne. Joseph had never wanted to remarry after the death of his beloved first wife, Isabella of Parma, although he had made some overtures toward Isabella's younger sister, Maria Luisa of Parma. Maria Luisa, however, was already promised to Charles, Prince of Asturias and, in any case, was not interested.

Joseph did not find Maria Josepha physically attractive either—he described her in a letter when he first saw her as, "She is twenty five. She has never had smallpox, and the very thought of the disease makes me shudder. Her figure is short, thickset, and without a vestige of charm. Her face is covered with spots and pimples. Her teeth are horrible." However, Wenzel Anton, Prince of Kaunitz-Rietberg, had wanted Joseph to marry Maria Josepha because of the Bavarian connection, so she was ultimately selected to be Joseph's bride.

A month after his wedding, Joseph sent off a long, self-pitying letter to his first wife's father. He did not have anything in common with his new wife, he admitted; however, as far as her character was concerned, Maria Josepha was an "irreproachable woman" who loved him, and he valued her for her positive traits but suffered because he could not love her. Even her enemies admitted that Josepha was amiable, obliging, friendly to all, and disposed to every kind or benevolent sentiment; but her understanding was narrow as well as deficient in cultivation. Joseph further added, "I will keep the path of honour, and if I cannot be an affectionate husband, at least she will have in me a friend, who appreciates her good qualities and treats her with every imaginable consideration." Despite this, Joseph never kept his word.

As time went on he did more than treat Josepha with perfect frigidity. Maria Josepha's sister-in-law, Archduchess Maria Christina, once wrote: "I believe if I were his [Joseph's] wife and so maltreated I would run away and hang myself on a tree in Schonbrunn." Despite Joseph's cold behaviour towards her, Maria Josepha had loved her husband with much ardour and was deeply affected by his unkindness towards her. Being of a meek and timid disposition, and conscious of her own inferiority, she trembled and turned pale whenever she came in her husband's presence. The only member of the imperial family who took the poor young queen under his wing was her father-in-law, Emperor Francis I; and when Francis died shortly after her marriage, she had no real support in the court. Upon Francis I's death on 18 August 1765, Maria Josepha became empress of the Holy Roman Empire following her husband's accession to the throne. Her mother-in-law, however, remained the most powerful and important power figure in the Empire and at court in Vienna.

Maria Josepha and Joseph's short-lived marriage did not produce any children, but for much of the two years of her marriage, Josepha's state of health led her and others to suppose that she was pregnant. In October 1765, in sentences delicately omitted by Arneth from a published version of a letter to his younger brother Leopold, Joseph wrote: 'As for my empress, there is no change. She has no illness but considerable disturbance. She [Josepha] maybe pregnant though without the slightest swelling. I just don't understand it, and I console myself with the happy life I lead as a bachelor husband.'

Next month, he wrote: 'I live almost as a bachelor, getting up at 6 o'clock in the morning, going to bed at 11, seeing my wife only at table and touching her only in bed.' In the same month, Josepha's mistress of the household retired, because she could no longer bear to contemplate the tableau de ce mauvais menage. Apparently, the young empress had made matters worse for herself by telling her troubles to her servants.

== Death ==
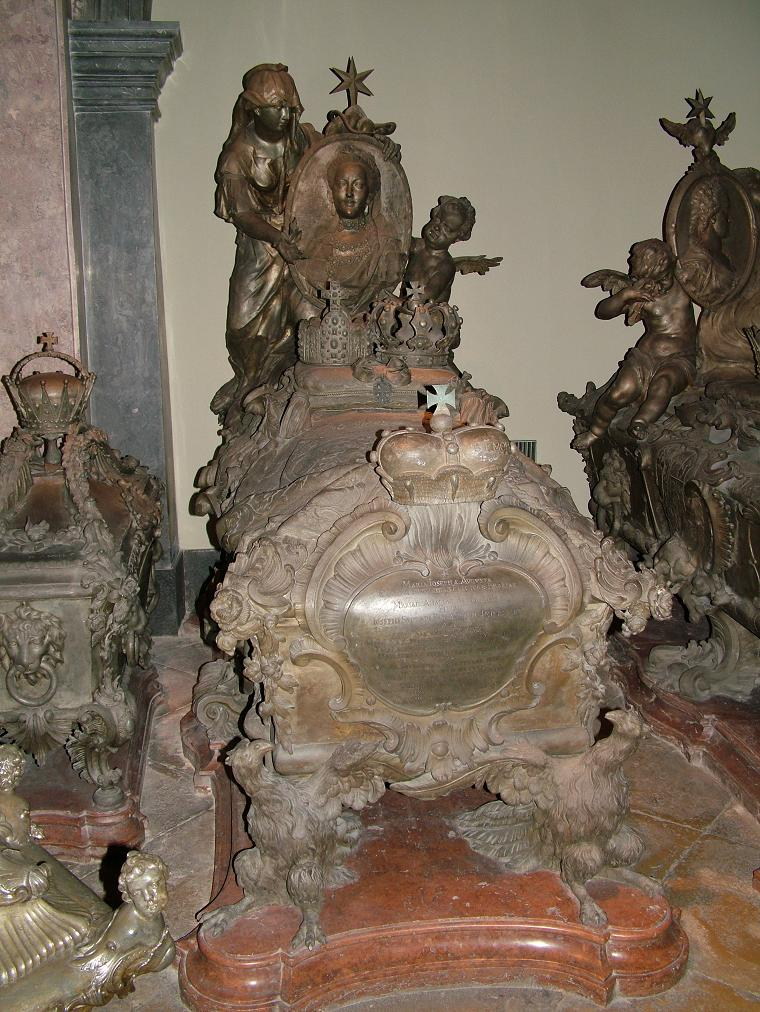
Maria Josepha's tomb in the Imperial Crypt, Vienna

On 28 May 1767, after only two years of marriage, Maria Josepha died of smallpox, as had her predecessor Isabella. Upon the young empress' death, the Court immediately plunged into mourning. Her husband did not visit her during her illness, although her mother-in-law, Maria Theresa, did. In doing so, Maria Theresa also caught the disease, but survived.

In Joseph's first reaction to receiving the news of his wife's death, he had told some of his intimates some remarks which imply regrets for the coldness he had shown to her. He further brought himself to tell his sister-in-law, Duchess Maria Antonia of Bavaria, that his wife had been "for so many reasons worthy of respect". Maria Josepha was buried in the Imperial Crypt in Vienna, but Joseph did not attend her burial.

The unloved young empress played a role in her husband's life once more after her death, when he laid claim to a large part of Bavaria in 1778–1779. He based his claim on, among other grounds, his marriage to his Bavarian second wife. This conflict eventually grew into the War of the Bavarian Succession. In the end, the Habsburg monarchy gained only the Innviertel.

== Ancestry ==
Ancestors of Maria Josepha of Bavaria

8. Ferdinand Maria, Elector of Bavaria
4. Maximilian II Emanuel, Elector of Bavaria
9. Henriette Adelaide of Savoy
2. Charles VII, Holy Roman Emperor
10. John III Sobieski
5. Therese Kunigunde Sobieska
11. Marie Casimire Louise de La Grange d'Arquien
1. Maria Josepha of Bavaria
12. Leopold I, Holy Roman Emperor
6. Joseph I, Holy Roman Emperor
13. Eleonore Magdalene of Neuburg
3. Maria Amalia of Austria
14. John Frederick, Duke of Brunswick-Calenberg
7. Wilhelmine Amalie of Brunswick-Lüneburg
15. Benedicta Henrietta of the Palatinate

== Bibliography ==
- Beales, Derek Edward Dawson (1987). Joseph II: In the Shadow of Maria Theresa, 1741–1780. Vol. 1. Cambridge [Cambridgeshire]: Cambridge University Press. ISBN 0-521-24240-1. OCLC 13823416.
- Crankshaw, Edward (1969). Maria Theresa. A&C Black. ISBN 978-0670456314. OCLC 60648.
- Dixon, Simon (2010). Catherine the Great. Ecco. ISBN 978-0060786281.
- Vovk, Justin, C. (2010). In Destiny's Hands: Five Tragic Rulers, Children of Maria Theresa. iUniverse. ISBN 9781450200820.

Maria Josepha of Bavaria House of Wittelsbach Born: 20 March 1739 Died: 28 May 1767
Royal titles
Preceded by Wilhelmine Amalie of Brunswick-Lüneburg	Queen consort of the Romans; 1765	Vacant
Preceded by Maria Theresa of Austria	Holy Roman Empress; 1765–1767	Succeeded by Maria Luisa of Spain
