= Charles VII, Holy Roman Emperor =

Holy Roman Emperor from 1742 to 1745

Charles VII
- Imperator Romanorum
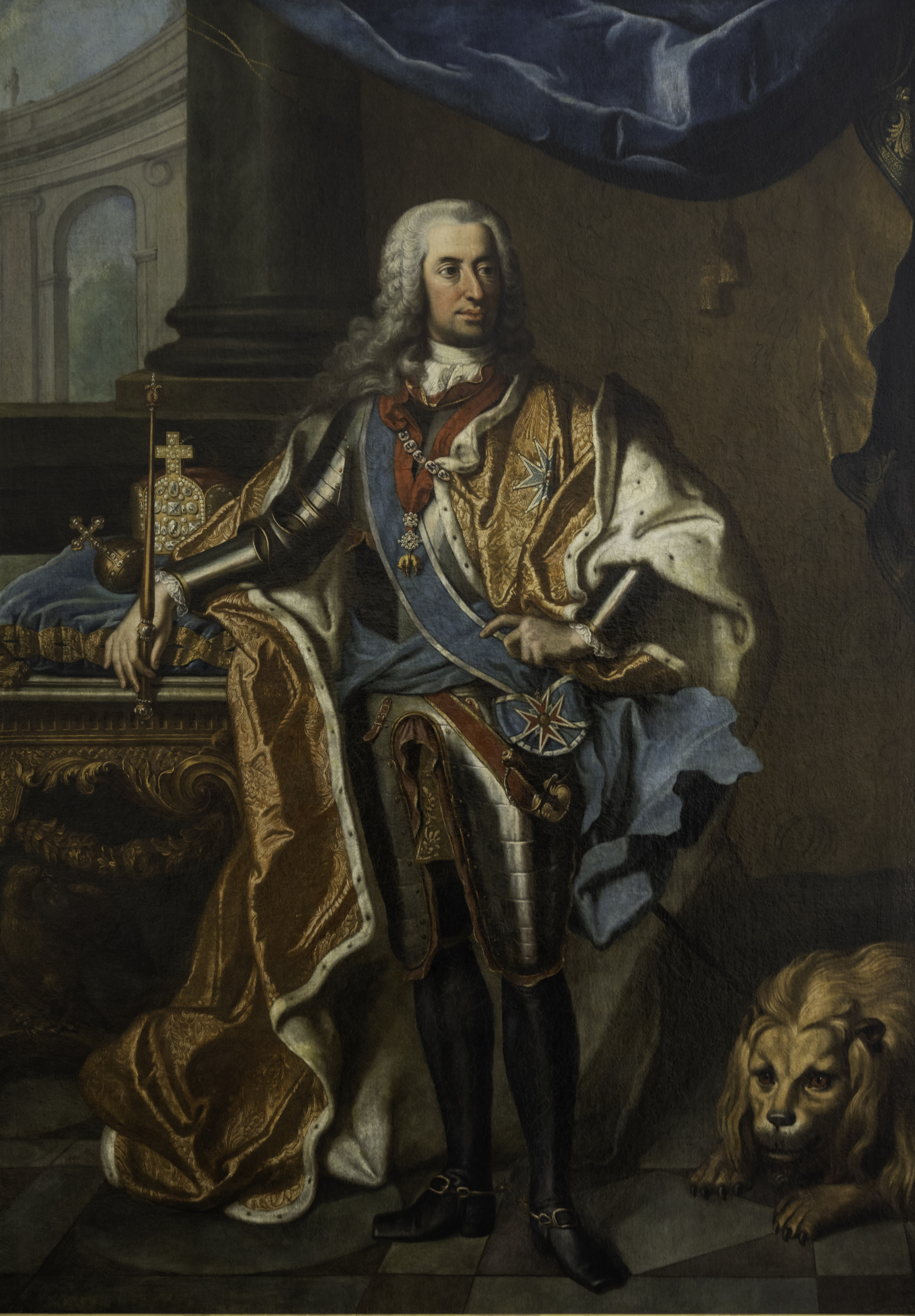
- Portrait by Georg Desmarées, c. 1745

Holy Roman Emperor
- Reign: 24 January 1742 – 20 January 1745
- Coronation: 12 February 1742; Frankfurt Cathedral
- Predecessor: Charles VI
- Successor: Francis I

King of Bohemia
- Reign: 19 December 1741 – 12 May 1743
- Coronation: 19 December 1741; St Vitus Cathedral
- Predecessor: Maria Theresa
- Successor: Maria Theresa

Elector of Bavaria
- Reign: 26 February 1726 – 20 January 1745
- Predecessor: Maximilian II Emanuel
- Successor: Maximilian III Joseph
- Born: 6 August 1697; Brussels, Duchy of Brabant Spanish Netherlands, Holy Roman Empire
- Died: 20 January 1745 (aged 47); Munich, Bavaria, Holy Roman Empire
- Burial: Theatine Church, Munich
- Spouse: Maria Amalia of Austria (m. 1722)
- Issue Detail: Duchess Maria Antonia of Bavaria; Theresa Benedicta of Bavaria; Maximilian III Joseph, Elector of Bavaria; Maria Anna Josepha of Bavaria; Maria Josepha of Bavaria
Names
- English: Charles Albert; German: Karl Albrecht
- House: Wittelsbach
- Father: Maximilian II Emanuel, Elector of Bavaria
- Mother: Theresa Kunegunda Sobieska
- Religion: Roman Catholicism

Charles VII (6 August 1697 – 20 January 1745) was elector of Bavaria from 26 February 1726 and Holy Roman Emperor from 24 January 1742 to his death on 20 January 1745. He was also King of Bohemia (as Charles Albert) from 1741 to 1743. Charles was a member of the House of Wittelsbach, and his reign as Holy Roman Emperor thus marked the end of three centuries of uninterrupted Habsburg imperial rule, although he was related to the Habsburgs by both blood and marriage.

Charles was the eldest son of Elector Maximilian II Emanuel of Bavaria and the Polish princess Theresa Kunegunda Sobieska. He became elector following the death of his father in 1726. In 1722, Charles married Archduchess Maria Amalia of Austria, daughter of Joseph I, Holy Roman Emperor and niece of Charles VI, Holy Roman Emperor. The couple had seven children together. After Charles VI died in 1740, Elector Charles claimed the Archduchy of Austria and briefly gained hold of the Bohemian throne. In 1742, he was elected emperor of the Holy Roman Empire. He ruled until his death three years later.

== Early life and career ==
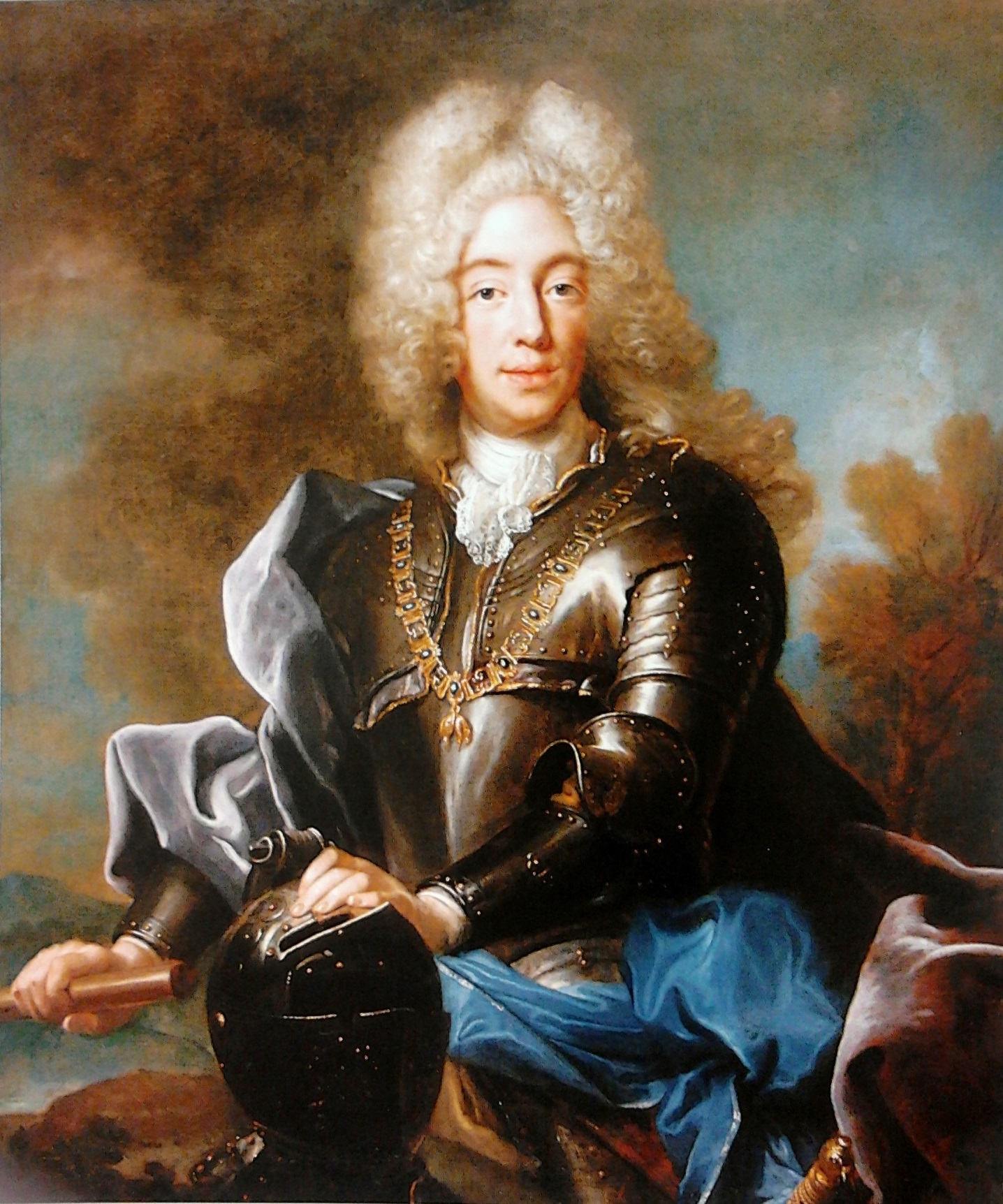
The young Charles Albert, 1717–1719, Joseph Vivien, Royal Castle in Warsaw

Charles (Albert) (German: Karl Albrecht) was born in Brussels and was the son of Maximilian II Emanuel, Elector of Bavaria, and Theresa Kunegunda Sobieska, daughter of King John III Sobieski of Poland.

His family was politically divided during the War of the Spanish Succession, and he spent many years under house arrest in Austria. The royal family had left Brussels and returned to Munich in 1701. His father fled to the Spanish Netherlands after he had been defeated at the Battle of Blenheim in August 1704, and Charles and his siblings stayed with their mother, the acting Regent, in Munich. In May 1705, after a stay in Venice, the Austrian authorities refused to allow the Electress to return to Electorate of Bavaria and forced her into exile, which lasted ten years. Maximilian Emanuel also went into exile to Compiègne after 29 April 1706, and an Imperial ban was imposed on him, as he again had been defeated at the Battle of Ramillies a few days earlier. Only in 1715 was the family reconciled. After reaching his majority in August 1715, Charles undertook an educational tour to Italy from 3 December 1715 to 24 August 1716. In 1717, he served among Bavarian auxiliaries in the Austro-Turkish War.

On 5 October 1722, Charles married Archduchess Maria Amalia of Austria, whom he had met at the imperial court in Vienna. She was the youngest daughter of the late Emperor Joseph I and his wife, Wilhelmine Amalia of Brunswick-Lüneburg. Bavaria had renounced all claims to the throne via the marriage, but it provided the legal basis for the inheritance of certain Austrian possessions.

In 1725, Charles visited Versailles during the wedding celebrations of Louis XV of France and established a personal contact with the French court.

In 1726, after his father had died, Charles became Duke of Bavaria and Elector Palatine and thus one of the prince-electors of the Holy Roman Empire, and he also inherited a debt of 26 million guilders. He maintained good relations with both his Habsburg relatives and France, continuing his father's policies.

In 1729, he instituted the knightly Order of St George and ordered the beginning of the construction of the Rothenberg Fortress.

== Holy Roman Emperor ==
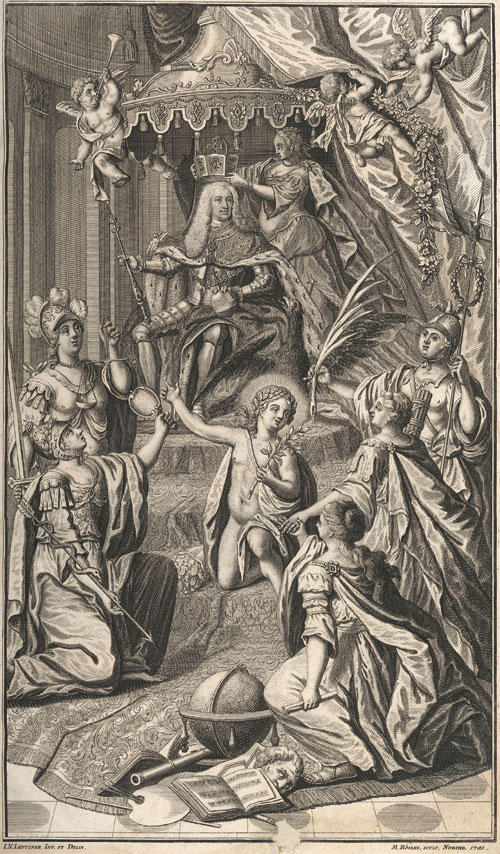
Allegorical depiction of Charles's coronation as Holy Roman Emperor (1742)

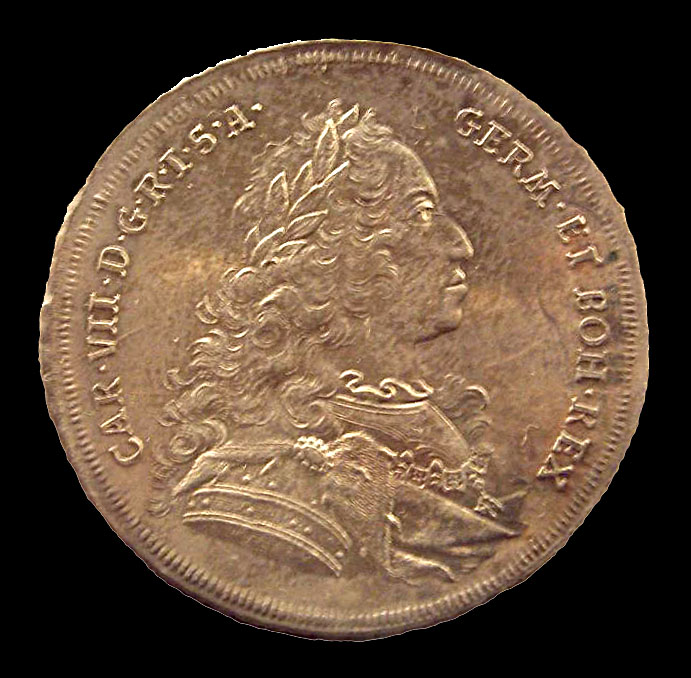
Thaler coin of Charles VII, dated 1743

In continuation of the policy of his father, Charles aspired to an even higher rank. As son-in-law of Emperor Joseph I, Charles rejected the Pragmatic Sanction of 1713 and claimed the German territories of the Habsburg dynasty against Maria Theresa, daughter of Charles VI, Holy Roman Emperor, in 1740. By the Treaty of Nymphenburg, which was concluded in July 1741, Charles became allied with France and Spain against Austria.

During the War of the Austrian Succession, Charles invaded Upper Austria in 1741 and planned to conquer Vienna, but his allied French troops under Charles Louis Auguste Fouquet, duc de Belle-Isle were instead redirected to Bohemia, capturing Prague in November 1741. That meant that Charles was crowned king of Bohemia in Prague on 19 December 1741, when the Habsburgs had not yet been defeated. He was elected king of Germany on 24 January 1742 and became Holy Roman emperor upon his coronation on 12 February 1742. His brother Clemens August of Bavaria, the archbishop-elector of Cologne, generally sided with the Habsburg-Lorraine faction in the disputes over the Habsburg succession but cast his vote for him and personally crowned him emperor at Frankfurt. King George II of Great Britain, as the elector of Hanover, also voted to install Charles as emperor even though both Britain and Hanover were allied with Austria in the ongoing war. Charles VII was the second Wittelsbach emperor after Louis IV, Holy Roman Emperor and the first Wittelsbach king of Germany since the reign of Rupert, King of the Romans.

Shortly after his coronation, most of Charles's territories were overrun by the Austrians, and Bavaria was occupied by the troops of Maria Theresa. The Emperor fled to Munich and resided for almost three years in the Palais Barckhaus in Frankfurt. Most of Bohemia was lost in December 1742, when the Austrians allowed the French under the Duc de Belle-Isle and François Marie de Broglie, 1st Duke of Broglie an honourable capitulation. Charles was mocked as an emperor who neither controlled his own realm nor was in effective control of the empire itself, but the institution of the Holy Roman emperor had largely become symbolic in nature and powerless by then. A popular Latin saying about him was "et Caesar et nihil", meaning "both emperor and nothing", a word play on aut Caesar aut nihil, meaning "either emperor or nothing". Bavarian General Ignaz Felix, Count of Törring-Jettenbach, was compared to a drum, as people "heard about him only when he was beaten".

Charles VII tried to boost his prestige from Frankfurt with numerous legal acts, such as granting imperial privilege to the University of Erlangen in 1743 and creating several new imperial nobles. Charles Eugene, Duke of Württemberg was declared to be of full age in 1744, ahead of time. Alexander Ferdinand, 3rd Prince of Thurn and Taxis served as Principal Commissioner for Charles VII at the Perpetual Diet of Regensburg and in 1744 the Thurn und Taxis dynasty were appointed the hereditary Postmasters General of the Imperial Reichspost.

The new commander of the Bavarian army, Friedrich Heinrich von Seckendorff, fought Austria in a series of battles in 1743 and 1744. In 1743, his troops and their allies took Bavaria, and Charles was able to return to Munich in April for some time before losing Bavaria again after his French allies were defeated and withdrew to the Rhine. Frederick II of Prussia's new campaign during the Second Silesian War finally forced the Austrian army to leave Bavaria and to retreat into Bohemia. In October 1744, Charles regained Munich and returned, this time for good. With former Vice-Chancellor Friedrich Karl von Schönborn as a go-between, the Emperor then sought to reach a compromise with Vienna but failed to get more military support from France.

Suffering severely from gout, Charles died at Nymphenburg Palace in January 1745. He is buried in the crypt of the Theatinerkirche in Munich. His heart was separately buried in the Shrine of Our Lady of Altötting. Georg Philipp Telemann composed his requiem "I was Hoping for Light". King Frederick the Great of Prussia wrote in 1746, "This death robbed me of the emperor, who was my friend".

Charles' brother Clemens August of Bavaria was more pro-Austrian, and Charles' son and successor Maximilian III Joseph made peace with Austria. With the Treaty of Füssen, Austria recognised the legitimacy of Charles's election as Holy Roman Emperor.

== Cultural legacy ==
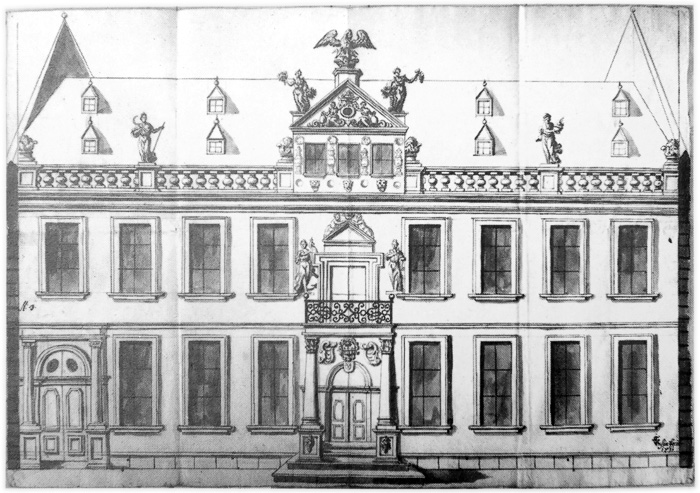
Emperor Charles's residence Palais Barckhaus in Zeil, Frankfurt, which he used in exile

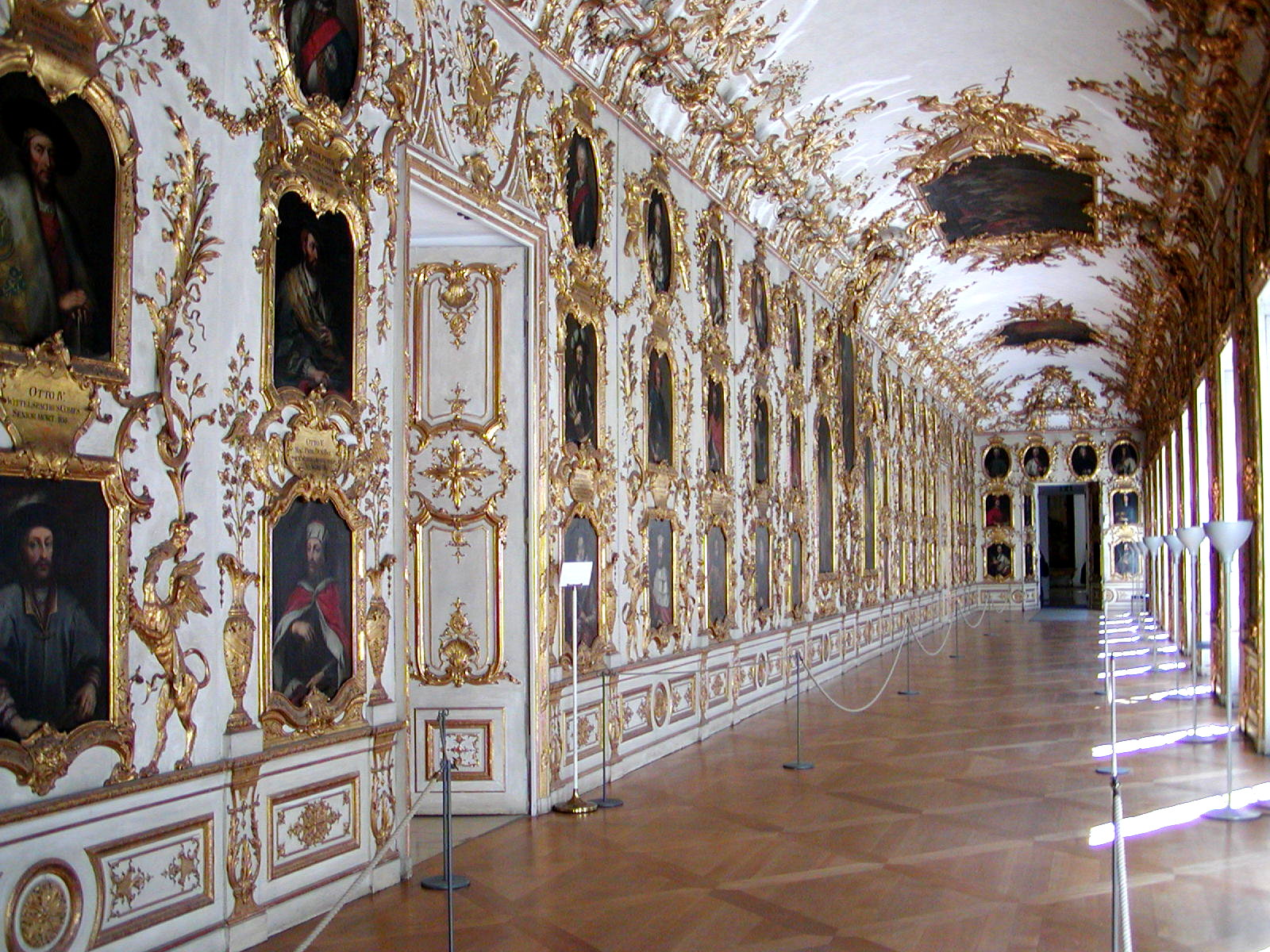
The Ancestral Gallery (Ahnengallerie, 1726–1731), Munich Residenz

Charles VII's reign represented the height of the Bavarian Rococo era. The Nymphenburg Palace was completed during his reign. The Grand Circle (Schlossrondell), which is flanked by a string of elaborate Baroque mansions, was initially planned as a basic blueprint for a new city (Carlstadt), but that was not achieved. Charles VII resided in Nymphenburg Palace, and the palace became the favourite summer residence of the future rulers of Bavaria. Charles effected the building of the Ancestral Gallery and the Ornate Rooms at the Munich Residenz. He purchased the Palais Porcia in 1731 and had the mansion restored in Rococo style in 1736 for one of his mistresses, Countess Topor-Morawitzka. The mansion was named after her husband, Prince Porcia. He also ordered François de Cuvilliés, chief architect of the court, to build the Palais Holnstein for another one of his mistresses, Maria Caroline Charlotte von Ingenheim, between 1733 and 1737. Cuvilliés constructed the Amalienburg as well for Charles and his wife, Maria Amalia, an elaborate hunting lodge designed in the Rococo style between 1734 and 1739 in the Nymphenburg Palace Park.

During Charles's reign, numerous accomplished Italian, French, Bavarian, and other German architects, sculptors, painters and artisans were employed in royal service, often for many years. Among them were Dominique Girard, François de Cuvilliés, Joseph Effner, Ignaz Günther, Johann Michael Fischer, Cosmas Damian Asam and Egid Quirin Asam, Johann Michael Feuchtmayer, Matthäus Günther, Johann Baptist Straub and Johann Baptist Zimmermann.

== Children ==
Charles and his wife, Archduchess Maria Amalia of Austria, were parents of seven children:

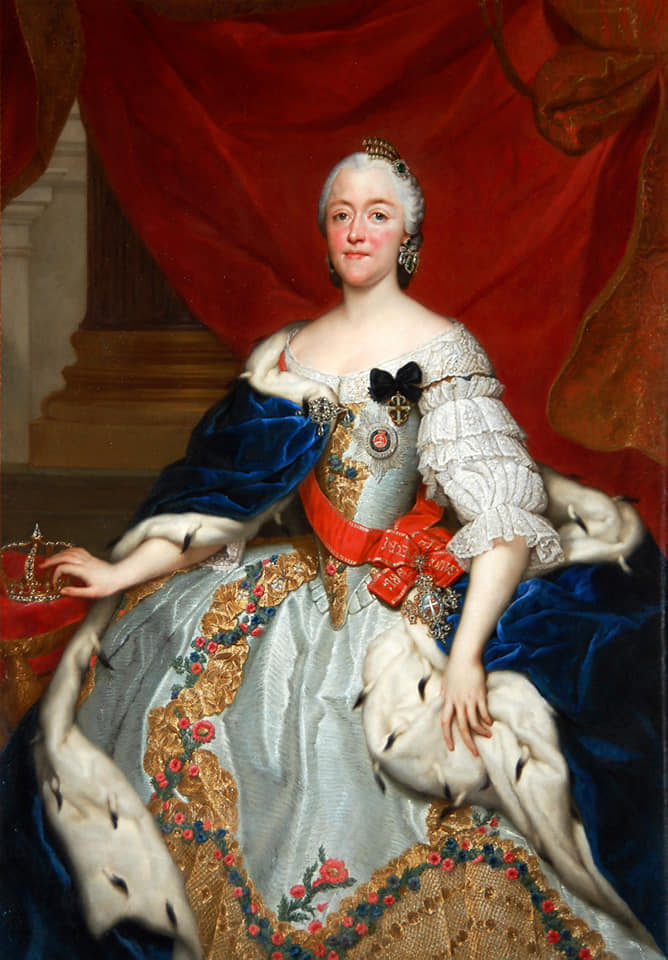
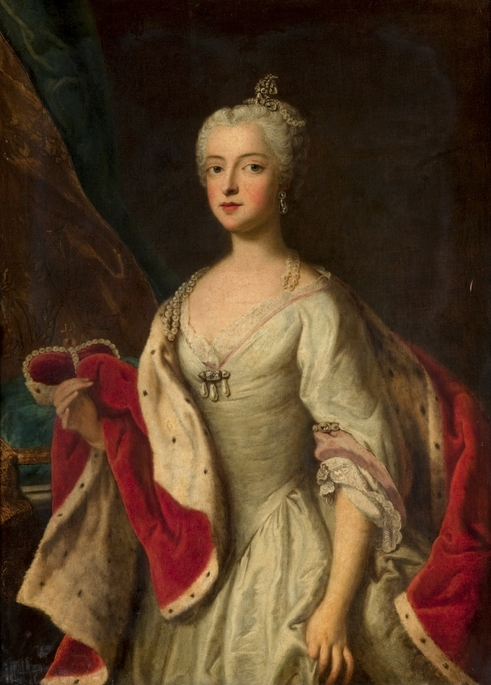
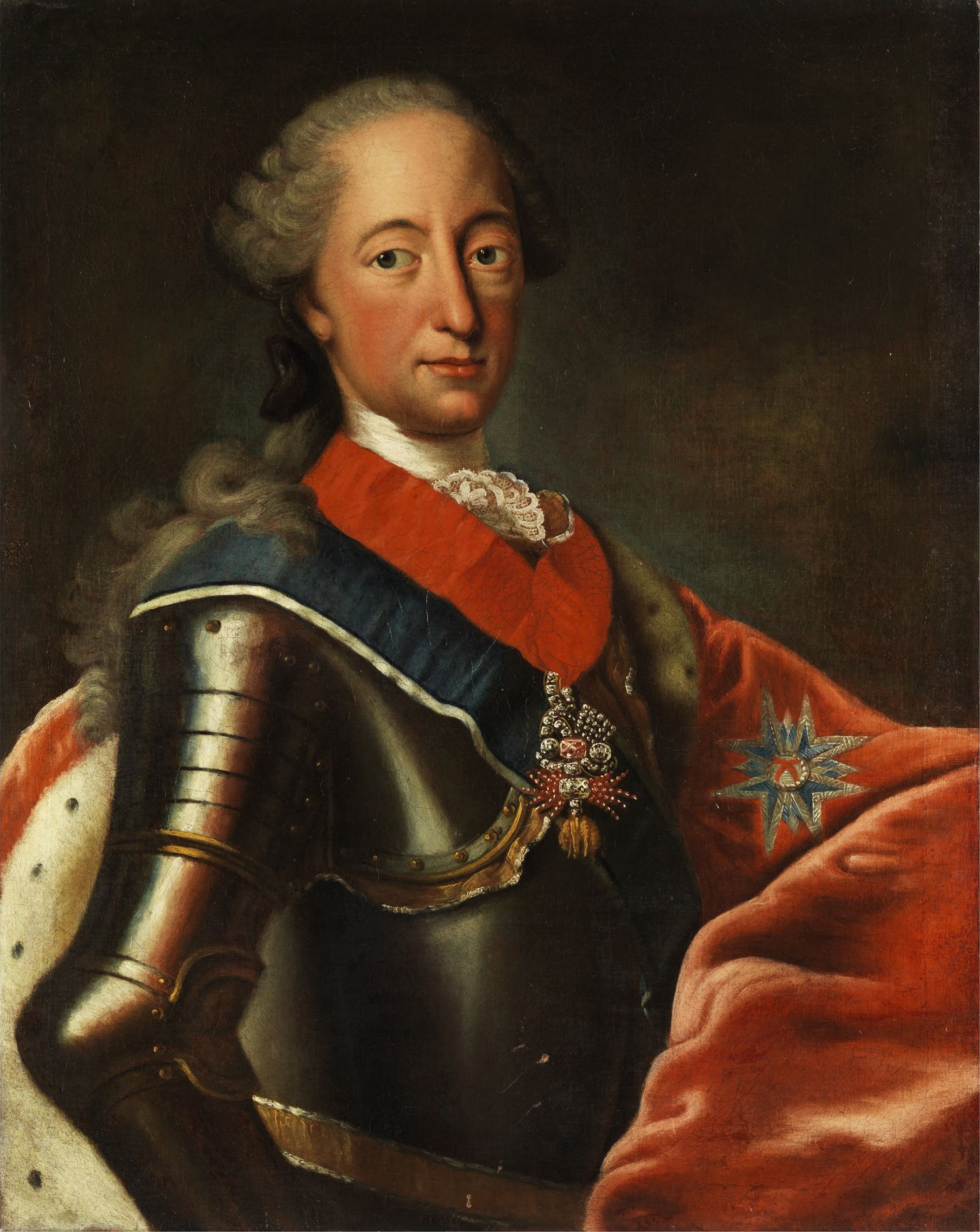
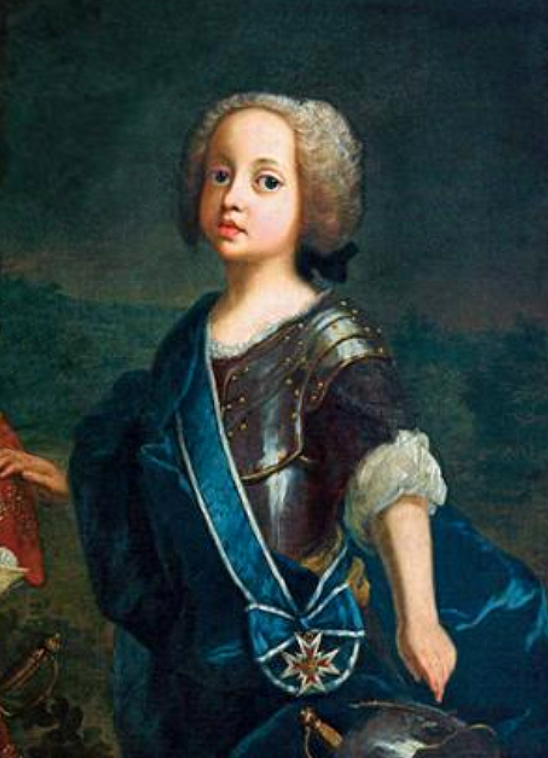
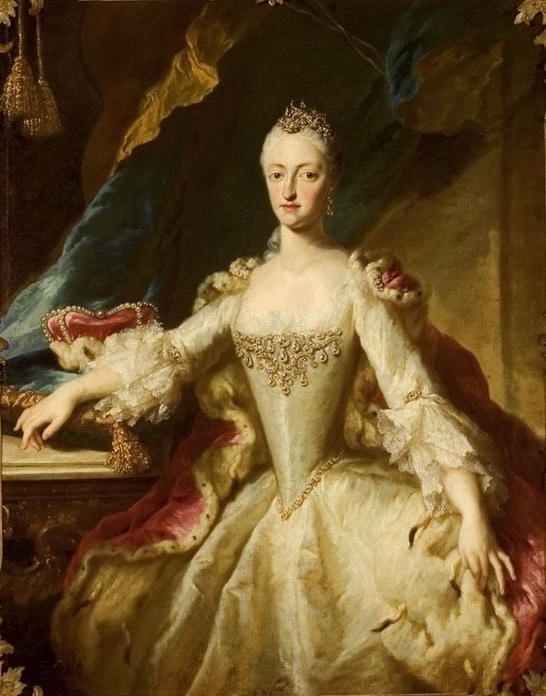
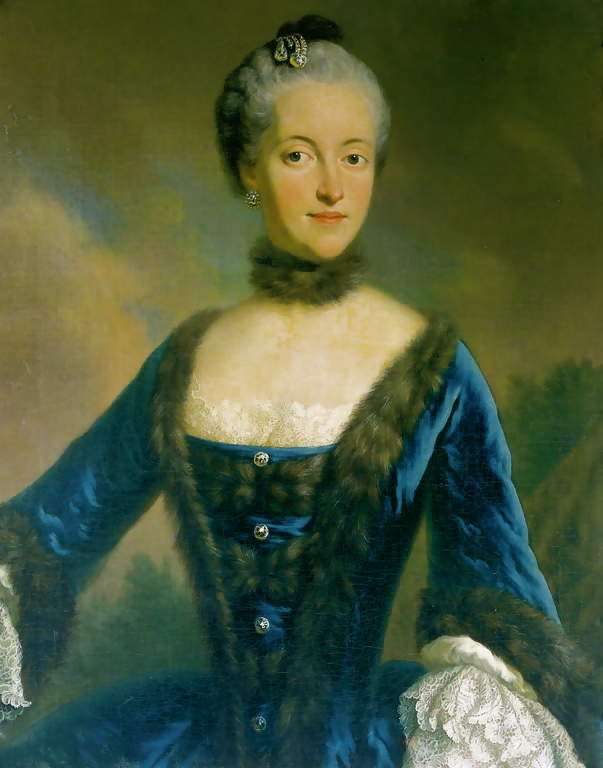
Name	Portrait	Birth	Death	Notes
Maximiliane Maria; Princess of Bavaria		12 April 1723		Died at birth.
Maria Antonia Walpurgis; Electress of Saxony		18 July 1724	23 April 1780	Married in 1747 Frederick Christian, Elector of Saxony, had issue.
Theresa Benedicta of Bavaria; Princess of Bavaria		6 December 1725	29 March 1743	Died young and unmarried.
Maximilian III Joseph, Elector of Bavaria; Elector of Bavaria		28 March 1727	30 December 1777	Married in 1747 Maria Anna Sophia of Saxony, no issue.
Joseph Ludwig Leo; Prince of Bavaria		25 August 1728	2 December 1733	Died in early childhood.
Duchess Maria Anna Josepha of Bavaria; Margravine of Baden-Baden		7 August 1734	7 May 1776	Married in 1755 Louis George, Margrave of Baden-Baden, no issue.
Maria Josepha of Bavaria; Holy Roman Empress		30 March 1739	28 May 1767	Married in 1765 Joseph II, Holy Roman Emperor, no issue.

=== Illegitimate children ===
Charles Albert and his mistress Maria Caroline Charlotte von Ingenheim had a daughter and a son:

- Maria Josepha von Hohenfels (1720–1797) ∞ Emmanuel François Joseph, Count of Bavaria (1695–1747), his half-brother, an illegitimate son of Maximilian II Emanuel and his French mistress Agnes Le Louchier. She had an issue:
  - Marie Amélie Caroline Josèphe Françoise Xavière of Bavaria, Countess of Hohenfels, Marchioness of Villacerf (1744–1820) ∞ Armand Charles Emmanuel de Hautefort, Marquess of Sarcelles.
- Franz Ludwig, Count of Holnstein (4 October 1723 – 22 May 1780) ∞ Anna Marie zu Löwenfeld (1735–1783), daughter of Clemens August of Bavaria. He had an issue:
  - Maximilian Joseph, Count of Holnstein ∞ Princess Maria Josepha of Hohenlohe-Waldenburg-Schillingsfürst (1774–1824), daughter of Charles Albert II, Prince of Hohenlohe-Waldenburg-Schillingsfürst.

== Titles and Arms ==
Charles VII, by the grace of God elected Holy Roman Emperor, forever August, King in Germany and of Bohemia, Duke in the Upper and Lower Bavaria as well as the Upper Palatinate, Count-Palatine of the Rhine, Archduke of Austria, Prince-Elector of the Holy Roman Empire, Landgrave of Leuchtenberg, etc.

Coat of arms
Coat of arms	Coat of arms (Shield variant)	Coat of arms (Shield variant with supporters)

== Ancestry ==
Ancestors of Charles VII, Holy Roman Emperor

8. Maximilian I, Elector of Bavaria
4. Ferdinand Maria, Elector of Bavaria
9. Archduchess Maria Anna of Austria (born 1610)
2. Maximilian II Emanuel
10. Victor Amadeus I, Duke of Savoy
5. Henriette Adelaide of Savoy
11. Christine of France
1. Charles VII, Holy Roman Emperor
12. Jakub Sobieski
6. John III Sobieski
13. Teofila Zofia Sobieska
3. Teresa Kunegunda Sobieska
14. Henri Albert de La Grange d'Arquien
7. Marie Casimire Louise de la Grange d'Arquien
15. Françoise de la Châtre

== See also ==
- War of the Austrian Succession
- War of the Bavarian Succession

Charles VII, Holy Roman Emperor House of Wittelsbach Born: 6 August 1697 Died: 20 January 1745
Regnal titles
Preceded by Maximilian II Emanuel	Elector of Bavaria; 26 February 1726 – 20 January 1745	Succeeded by Maximilian III Joseph
Preceded by Maria Theresa	King of Bohemia; 19 December 1741 – 12 May 1743	Succeeded by Maria Theresa
Preceded by Charles VI, Holy Roman Emperor	Holy Roman Emperor; King in Germany; 24 January 1742 – 20 January 1745	Succeeded by Francis I, Holy Roman Emperor
