= Georg Desmarées =

German painter (1697–1776)

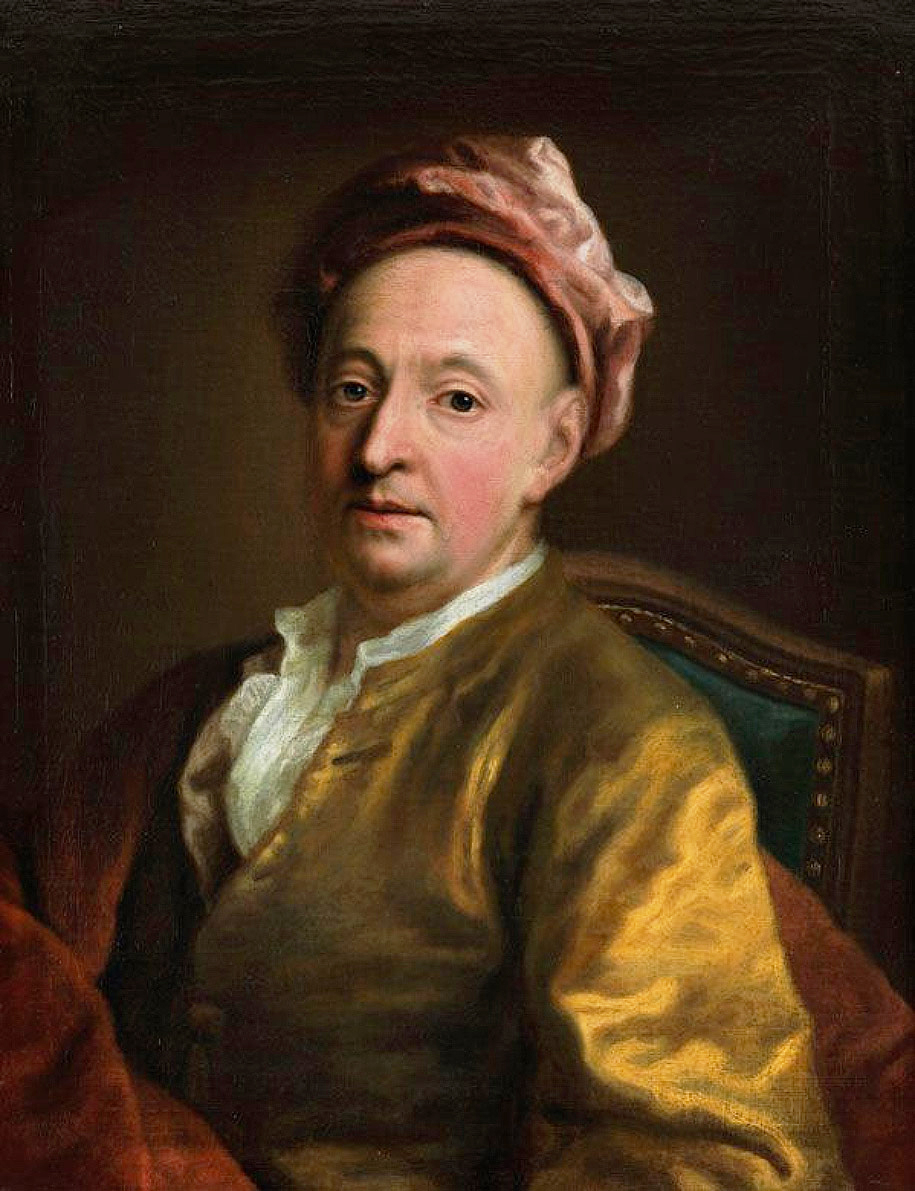
- Self-portrait, c. 1750
- Born: 29 October 1697; Stockholm, Sweden
- Died: 3 October 1776 (aged 78); Munich, Bavaria
- Other names: Georg Des Marées

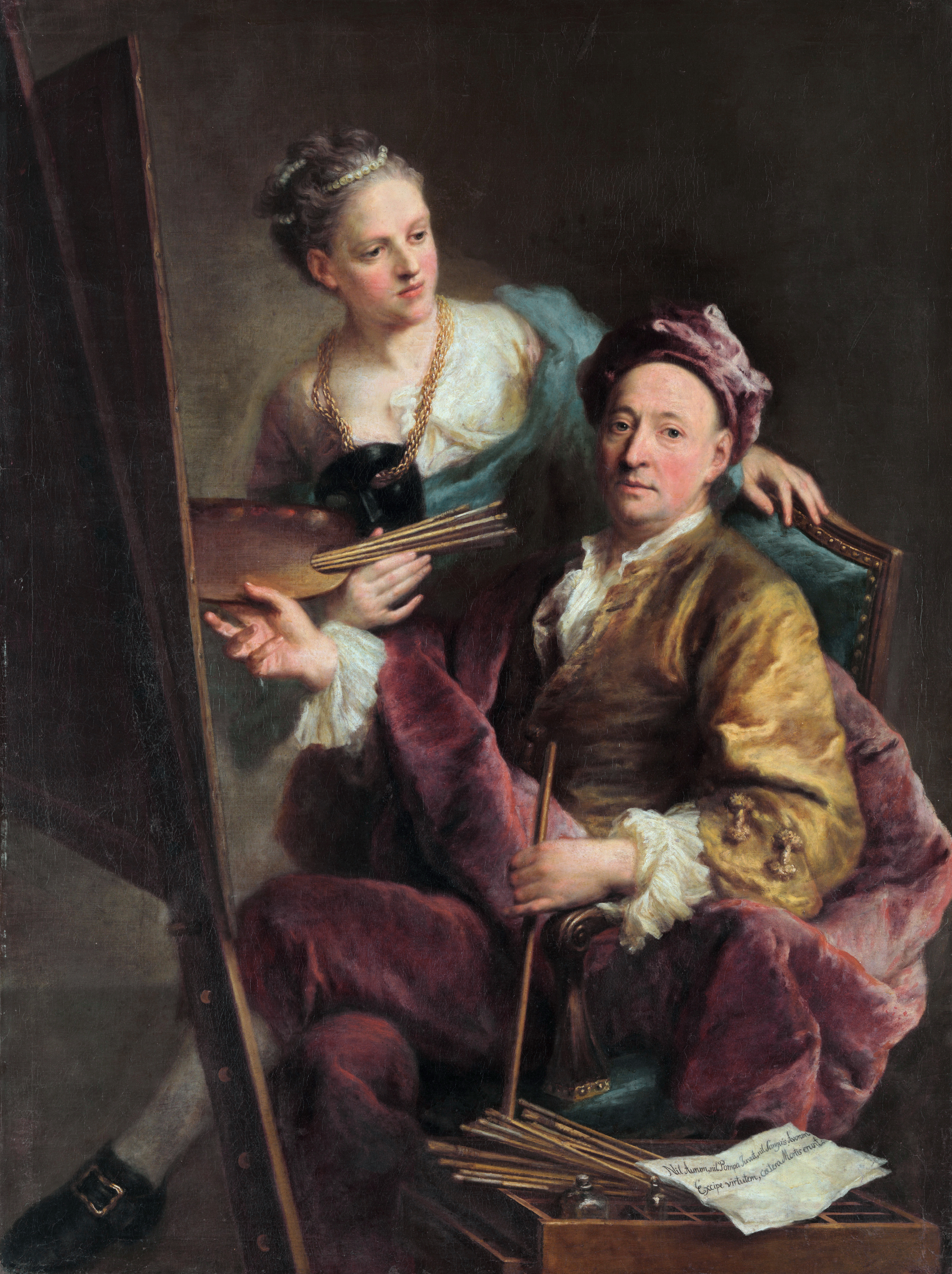
Self-portrait with his daughter, c. 1750

Georg Desmarées or Des Marées, (29 October 1697 – 3 October 1776) was a Swedish-born German portrait painter.

== Biography ==
Desmarées was born in 1697 in Stockholm, Sweden. He was the son of immigrant parents Jean Desmarées and Sara Meijteris. He was instructed in painting by a maternal relative, Martin Meytens (1648–1736), and later he became his assistant. In 1724 he made a stay in Amsterdam, and in the following year in Nuremberg where he visited the drawing academy of Johann Daniel Preissler (1666 –1737) and then in Venice, where he received further training from Italian Rococo painter Giovanni Battista Piazzetta (c. 1682–1754).

In 1731, he married Barbara Marie Schuhbauer and settled in Munich where he became a court painter. His wife died in 1743.

He continued to reside in Munich until his own death in 1776. A portrait of himself and one of his daughter are, with a third in the Munich Gallery, and other portraits by him are in Augsburg.

== Gallery ==
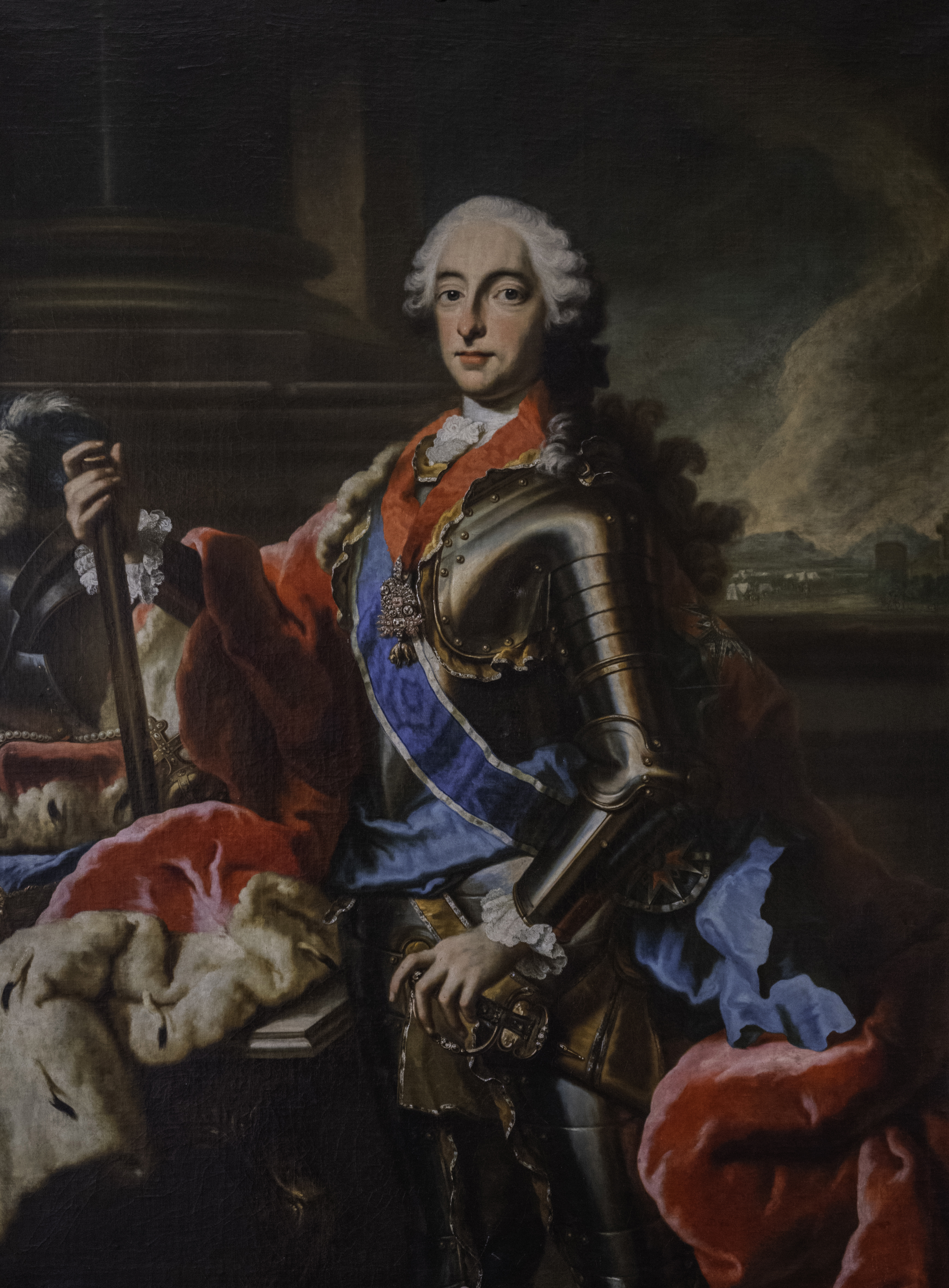
Maximilian III Joseph, Elector of Bavaria

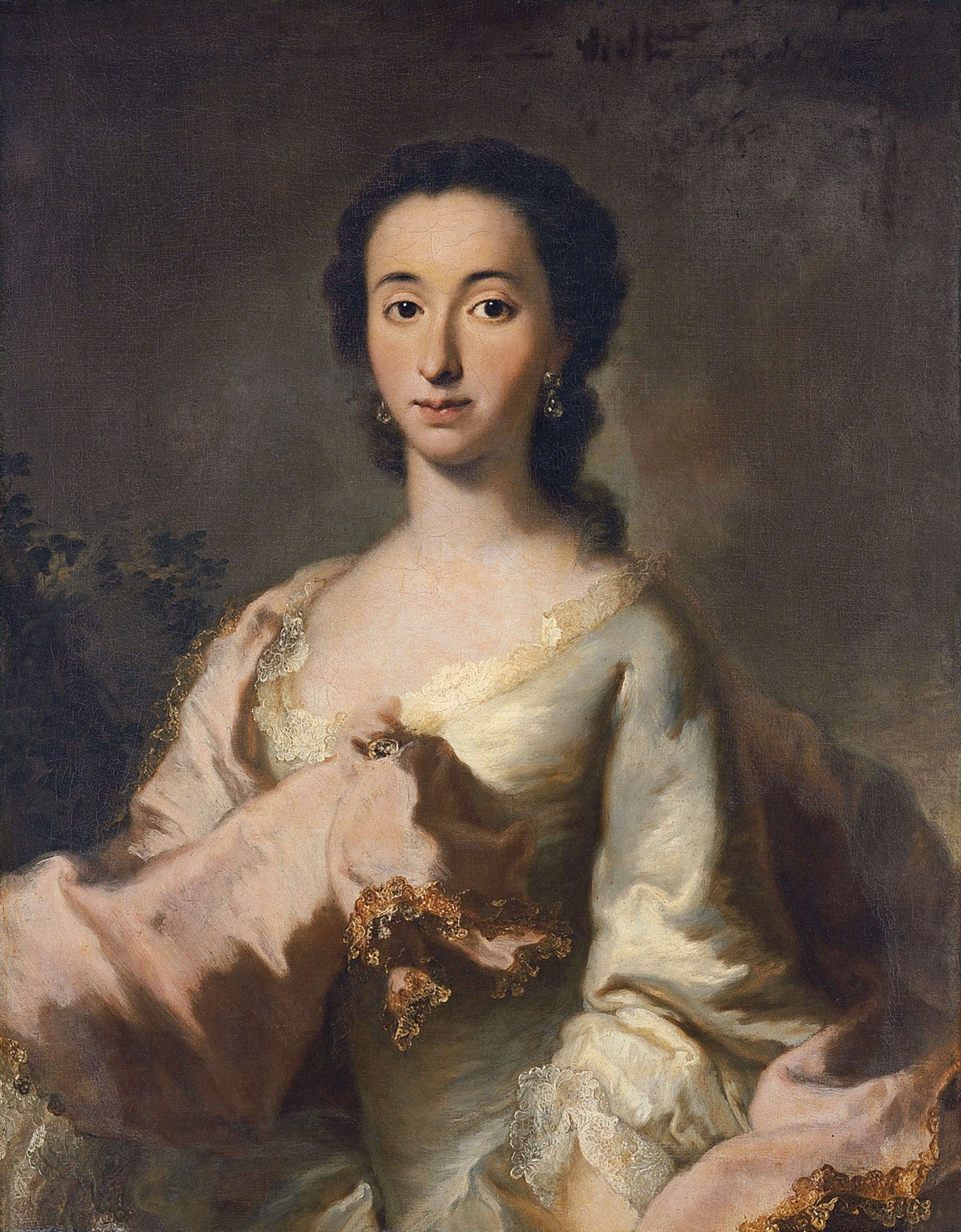
Maria Rosa Walburga von Soyer, 1750, now at the Thyssen-Bornemisza Museum

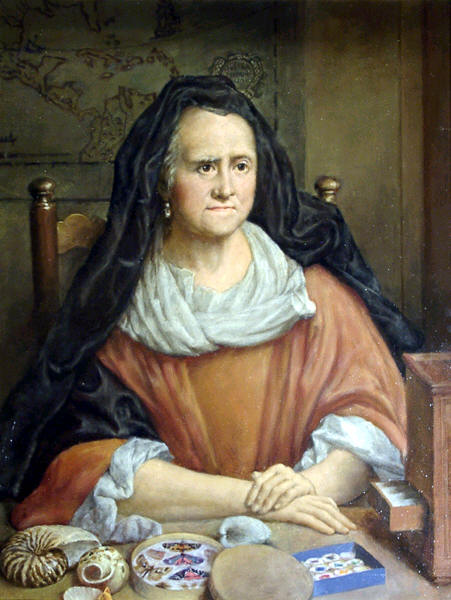
Portrait of Esther Barbara von Sandrart
