= Maximilian III Joseph =

Elector of Bavaria from 1745 to 1777

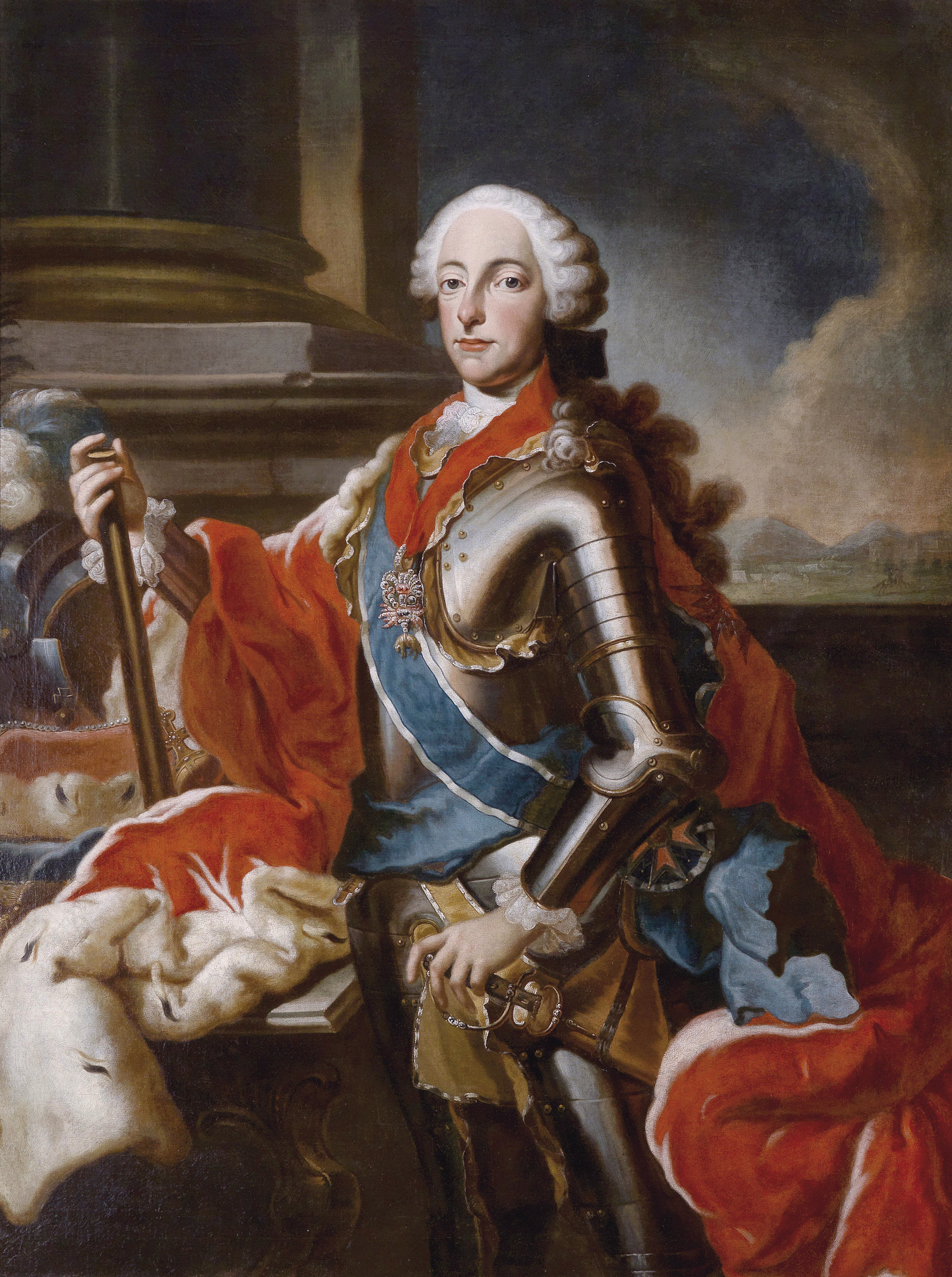
- Portrait of Maximilian III Joseph by Georg Desmarées

Elector of Bavaria
- Reign: 20 January 1745 – 30 December 1777
- Predecessor: Charles Albert
- Successor: Charles Theodore
- Born: 28 March 1727; Munich, Electorate of Bavaria, Holy Roman Empire
- Died: 30 December 1777 (aged 50); Munich, Electorate of Bavaria, Holy Roman Empire
- Burial: Theatine Church
- Spouse: Maria Anna Sophia of Saxony (m. 1747)
- House: Wittelsbach
- Father: Charles VII, Holy Roman Emperor
- Mother: Maria Amalia of Austria
- Religion: Roman Catholicism

Maximilian III Joseph (28 March 1727 – 30 December 1777), also known by his epithet "the much beloved" was a Prince-elector of the Holy Roman Empire and Duke of Bavaria from 1745 to 1777. He was the last of the Bavarian branch of the House of Wittelsbach and because of his death, the War of Bavarian Succession broke out.

== Biography ==
=== Birth and reign ===
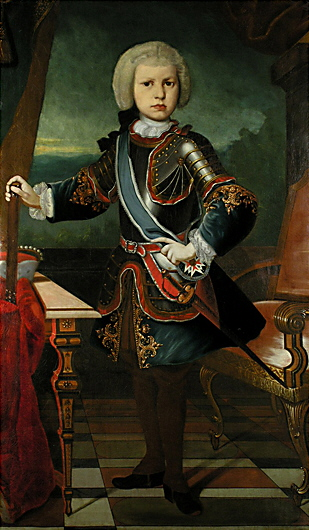
Maximilian Joseph as electoral prince.

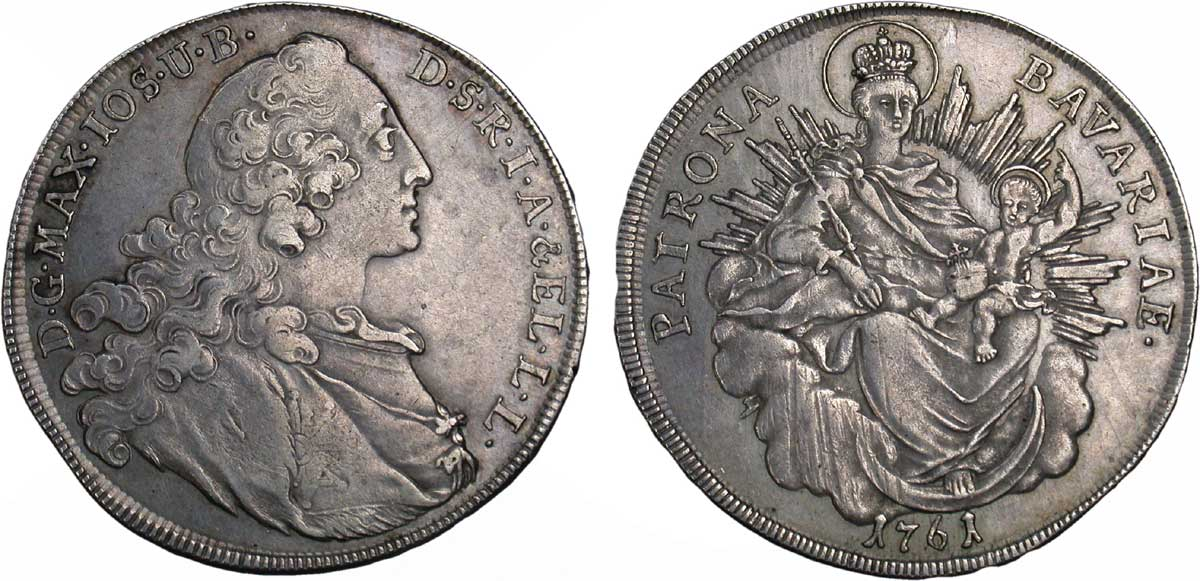
Maximilian III Joseph, 1761

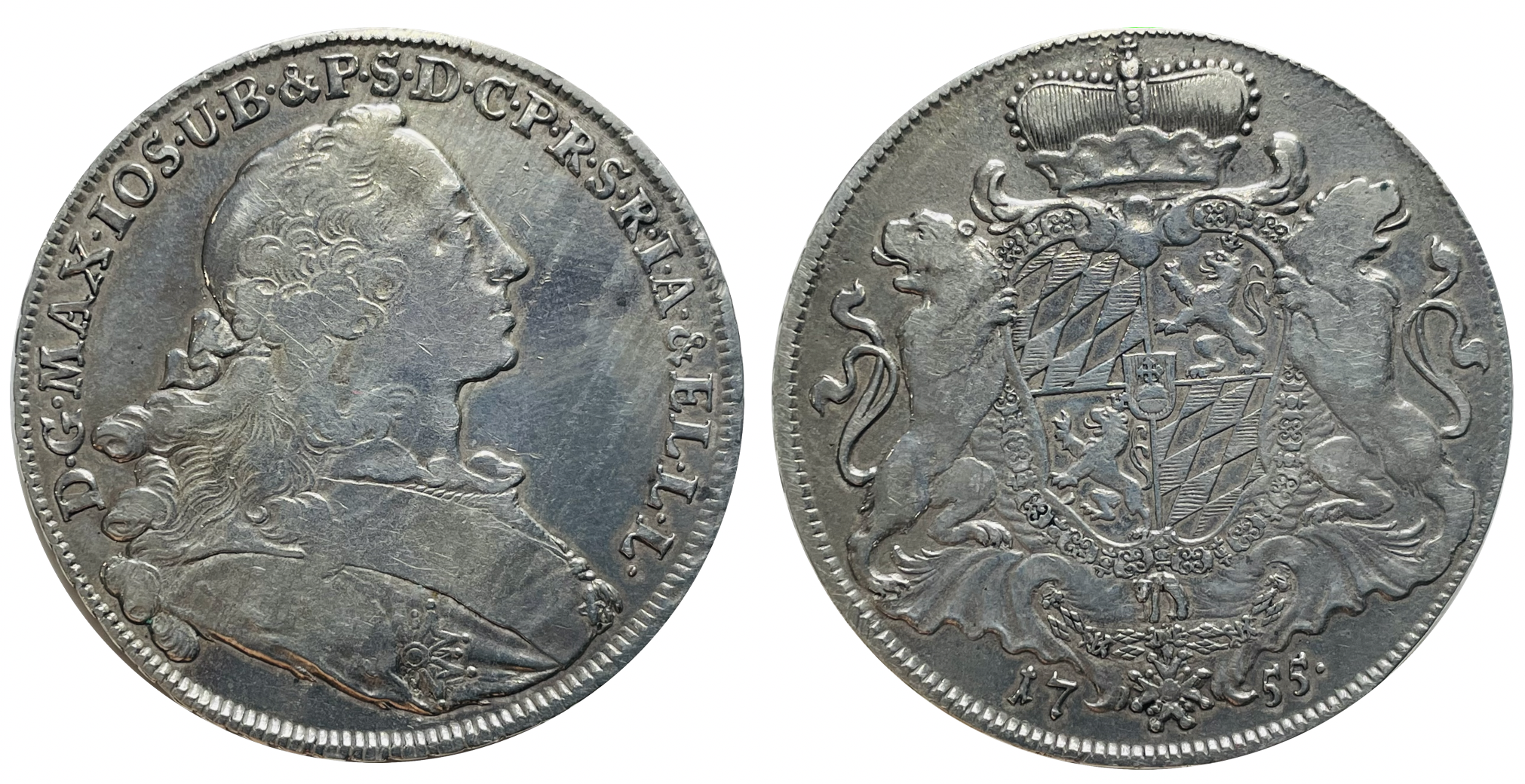
Silver coin: 1 koventionsthaler of Bavaria, Maximilian III Joseph, 1755

Born in Munich, Maximilian was the eldest son of Holy Roman Emperor Charles VII and his wife, Maria Amalia of Austria, daughter of Joseph I, Holy Roman Emperor. Upon his father's death in January 1745, he inherited a country in the process of being invaded by Austrian armies (see War of the Austrian Succession). The 18-year-old Maximilian Joseph wavered between the Peace-party, led by his mother Maria Amalia and Army Commander Friedrich Heinrich von Seckendorff and the War-party, led by Foreign Minister General Ignaz Count of Törring and the French envoy Chavigny. After the decisive defeat in the Battle of Pfaffenhofen on 15 April Maximilian Joseph quickly abandoned his father's imperial pretenses and made peace with Maria Theresa in the Treaty of Füssen, in which he agreed to support her husband, Francis Stephen, in the upcoming imperial election.

In 1747, Maximilian married his first cousin, Maria Anna Sophia of Saxony, but the marriage remained childless. During the Seven Years' War Bavarian forces then fought on the Habsburg side. Maximilian Joseph's sister Maria Josepha was married in 1765 to Maria Theresa's son, Archduke Joseph. But long-term weakening of Prussia was not in Bavarian interest, as that country offered the only counterweight to the Habsburg monarchy. Maximilian Joseph tried, as far as possible, to keep Bavaria out of conflict. Apart from militia troops, he sent only a small force of 4,000 men to join the Austrian army. In 1758–59, only a year and half into the war, he withdrew Bavarian auxiliary troops from Austrian service. Together with Charles Theodore, Elector Palatine he enforced the neutrality of the Empire during the conflict.

Maximilian Joseph was a progressive and enlightened ruler who did much to improve the development of his country. He encouraged agriculture, industry, and exploitation of the mineral wealth of the country, and abolished the Jesuit censorship of the press. In 1747, the Nymphenburg Porcelain Factory was established, while the Codex Maximilianeus bavaricus civilis was written in 1756. In 1759, he founded Munich's first academic institution, the Bavarian Academy of Sciences. During severe famine in 1770 Maximilian sold some of the crown jewels to pay for grain imports to relieve hunger. In that year, he also issued an edict against the extravagant pomposity of the Church which contributed to the end of the era of Bavarian rococo. He also forbade the Oberammergau Passion Play. In 1771, the elector regulated general school attendance.

=== Death ===
In December 1777 Maximilian Joseph rode in his carriage through Munich; on the ride, as he passed one of the tower clocks, the mechanism broke, and the clock struck 77 times. Maximilian Joseph interpreted this as a bad omen and that his life would end soon. Within days, he fell ill with an unknown affliction. None of his 15 doctors could diagnose it, but by Christmas, it became clear that he was suffering from a particularly virulent strain of smallpox, called "purple small pox" at the time. By the end of the month, Maximilian was dead without any heirs and is buried in the crypt of the Theatinerkirche in Munich.

== Legacy ==
=== Succession crisis ===
As the last of the junior branch of the Wittelsbach dynasty, and which had ruled Bavaria since the 14th century, Maximilian's death led to a succession dispute and brief War of the Bavarian Succession. He was succeeded in the male line by his 12th cousin, once removed, Charles Theodore, Elector Palatine.

Maximilian's widow, Maria Anna Sophia, and Maximilian's sister, Maria Antonia Walpurga, as well as Maria Anna of Palatinate-Sulzbach, negotiated with Maximilian's reluctant heir and intervened together with Frederick II of Prussia and the new elector's own heir presumptive, Charles II August, Duke of Zweibrücken, to secure Bavaria's independence from Austria. The Prussian king threatened both the emperor and Bavaria itself with war. Austria had already invaded portions of the duchy immediately after the Elector's death and the new elector had little interest in his new domain. Instead, Charles Theodore made repeated attempts to exchange it for Further Austria or the Austrian Netherlands for proximity to his Palatinian homelands.

=== Cultural legacy ===
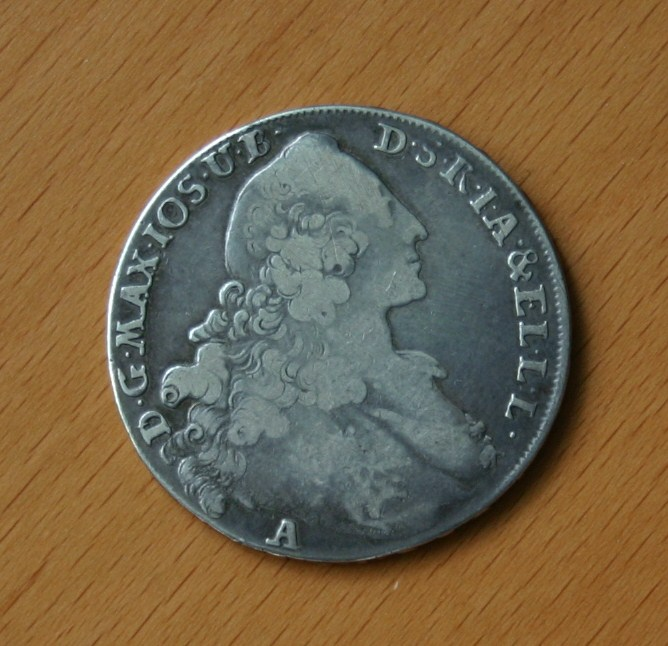
Conventionsthaler with the portrait of Maximilian III. Joseph

Arms of the Bavarian electorate 1753

Maximilian III Joseph ordered in 1751 François de Cuvilliés to construct the splendid rococo Cuvilliés Theatre and in 1755 the Stone Hall of Nymphenburg Palace. He also ordered the decoration of several rooms of the New Schleissheim Palace in the rococo style.

Wolfgang Amadeus Mozart was received by Maximilian III Joseph, who was like his sister, Maria Antonia Walpurga, skilled in music and composed, but due to a need for strict frugality no post could be offered. In 1775, La finta giardiniera, an Italian opera by Mozart, received its first performance at the Salvatortheater in Munich.

In 1770 Maximilian III Joseph established the precursor to the Academy of Fine Arts, Munich.

== Ancestry ==
Ancestors of Maximilian III Joseph

8. Ferdinand Maria, Elector of Bavaria
4. Maximilian II Emanuel, Elector of Bavaria
9. Henriette Adelaide of Savoy
2. Charles VII, Holy Roman Emperor
10. John III Sobieski
5. Therese Kunigunde of Bavaria
11. Marie Casimire Louise de la Grange d'Arquien
1. Maximilian III Joseph
12. Leopold I, Holy Roman Emperor
6. Joseph I, Holy Roman Emperor
13. Eleonore-Magdalena of Pfalz-Neuburg
3. Maria Amalia of Austria
14. John Frederick, Duke of Brunswick-Lüneburg
7. Wilhelmina Amalia of Brunswick
15. Benedicta-Henrietta of Simmern

Maximilian III Joseph House of Wittelsbach Born: 28 March 1727 Died: 30 December 1777
Regnal titles
| Preceded by Charles Albert | Elector of Bavaria; 1745–1777 | Succeeded by Charles Theodore |
