= Ceram =

Ceram may refer to:

- Ceram or Seram Island, largest of the Mollucas in Indonesia
  - Ceram Sea, Indonesia
  - Ceram languages
  - Ceram rat
  - Ceram fruit bat
  - Ceram mangrove monitor, a lizard
- C. W. Ceram, pen name of Kurt Wilhelm Marek, German writer and journalist
  - Ceram Prize for writing on archeology
- MV Ceram, a Dutch cargo ship in service 1947–1953
- HNLMS Ceram, of Netherlands Navy 1946–1958
- CERAM, a materials testing organisation based in Penkhull, Stoke-on-Trent, now named Lucideon
