= Maria Caroline Charlotte von Ingenheim =

German courtier

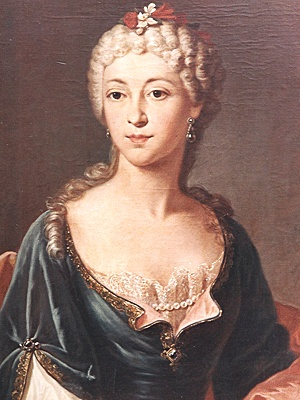
Maria Caroline Charlotte von Ingenheim

Maria Caroline Charlotte, Countess von Spreti (née Baroness Maria Caroline Charlotte von Ingenheim; 2 August 1704 – 27 May 1749), was a German courtier and the royal mistress of Charles VII, Holy Roman Emperor, from 1719 to 1723.

== Early life ==
Baroness Maria Caroline Charlotte von Ingenheim was born on * 2 August 1704 in Wanfried. She was the daughter of Baron Daniel von Ingenheim, Lord of Lorry (1666–1723) and, his wife, Princess Maria Anna Johanna von Hessen-Wanfried (1685–1764). Her father, a Huguenot nobleman from Metz, had fled to Germany, worked as master of the stables for the estranged Charles, Landgrave of Hesse-Wanfried, and married the daughter of his new employer. He was elevated to the rank of Baron and converted to his wife's Catholic faith upon their marriage. The couple lived primarily in Erfurt.

== Court life ==
Baroness von Ingenheim went to Munich as a lady-in-waiting in 1719. Her maternal uncles were Christian, Landgrave of Hesse-Wanfried-Rheinfels, and Dominic Marquard, Prince of Löwenstein-Wertheim-Rochefort and Prince Francis II Rákóczi. Her brother, Karl Wilhelm von Ingenheim, had also been a page at the Munich court since 1717.

She quickly became the favorite of the Elector Prince and later Elector and Emperor Charles Albert. The liaison produced a daughter in 1720 and a son in 1723. Between 1733 and 1737, the Elector Prince later built Holnstein Palace for her son in Munich (the residence of the Archbishop of Munich and Freising since 1818).

== Personal life ==
In 1723, she married Count Franz Johann Hieronymus Innozenz von Spreti (1695–1772). During their 26 years of marriage, she had 14 children, including:

- Maria Theresia von Spreti (1746–1818), who married to Major General Andreas Anton von Capris.

The Countess von Spreti died on 27 May 1749 in Munich. Count Hieronymus in 1772. Both were buried in the Franciscan monastery of St. Antonius in Munich. She was the grandmother of Major General Maximilian von Spreti.

=== Relationship with Charles VII ===
From her relationship with Emperor Charles VII, she was the mother of:

- Countess Maria Josepha von Hohenfels (1720–1797), who married Emmanuel François Joseph, Count of Bavaria, her father's half-brother, who was the illegitimate son Elector Maximilian II Emanuel and his French mistress Agnes Le Louchier, in 1736.
- Count Franz Ludwig von Holnstein (1723–1780), who married Anna Marie von Löwenfeld, the illegitimate daughter of his paternal uncle, Duke Clemens August of Bavaria, and his mistress Mechthild Brion.

Through her son Franz Ludwig, she was the ancestral mother of the Grafen von Holnstein aus Bayern line. Her grandson, Count Maximilian Joseph von Holnstein (1760–1838), was governor of the Upper Palatinate, and married Karoline Josepha von Bretzenheim, an illegitimate daughter of Charles Theodore, Elector of Bavaria (from his relationship with Maria Josefa Seyfert, Countess von Heydeck), in 1784.
