= Valley of the Kings (film) =

1954 film by Robert Pirosh

- Original French film poster
- Directed by: Robert Pirosh
- Written by: Robert Pirosh; Karl Tunberg
- Based on: Gods, Graves and Scholars; 1949 book by C. W. Ceram
- Starring: Robert Taylor; Eleanor Parker; Samia Gamal
- Cinematography: Robert Surtees
- Edited by: Harold F. Kress
- Music by: Miklós Rózsa
- Production company: Metro-Goldwyn-Mayer
- Distributed by: Metro-Goldwyn-Mayer
- Release date: July 21, 1954
- Running time: 86 minutes
- Country: United States
- Language: English
- Budget: $2,065,000
- Box office: $3,305,000

Valley of the Kings is a 1954 American Eastmancolor adventure film produced by Metro-Goldwyn-Mayer. It was written and directed by Robert Pirosh from a screenplay by Robert Pirosh and Karl Tunberg, "suggested by historical data" in the 1949 book Gods, Graves and Scholars by C. W. Ceram. The music was by Miklós Rózsa and the cinematography by Robert Surtees.

== Plot ==
In 1900, Ann Mercedes (Eleanor Parker) travels to Cairo with her husband Philip (Carlos Thompson) and Mark Brandon (Robert Taylor). Phillip dies attempting to kill Mark. Mark is willing to help the couple because he used to work with Ann's deceased father. She is interested in visiting and studying the tomb of Pharaoh Rahotep. After many adventures, she seeks to prove its link with the tomb of Joseph. Their adventure is marred by intrigue, betrayal and murder.They are encountered by a villain, Hamad, who has evil motives in mind. Phillip and Hamad work together. After Hamad successfully traps Philip in a cave during their expedition, a subsequent confrontation results in Philip murdering Hamad before he dies.

== Cast ==
- Robert Taylor as Mark Brandon
- Eleanor Parker as Ann Barclay Mercedes
- Carlos Thompson as Philip Mercedes
- Kurt Kasznar as Hamed Backhour
- Victor Jory as Tuareg Chief
- Leon Askin as Valentine Arko
- Aldo Silvani as Father Anthimos
- Samia Gamal as Dancer
- Rushdy Abaza as Robed Man - Singer (uncredited)
- Leora Dana as Lovely Girl (uncredited)
- Frank de Kova as Akmed Salah - Nomad Guide (uncredited)
- Laurette Luez as Native Girl (uncredited)
- Paul Maxey as Prior (uncredited)

== Background ==
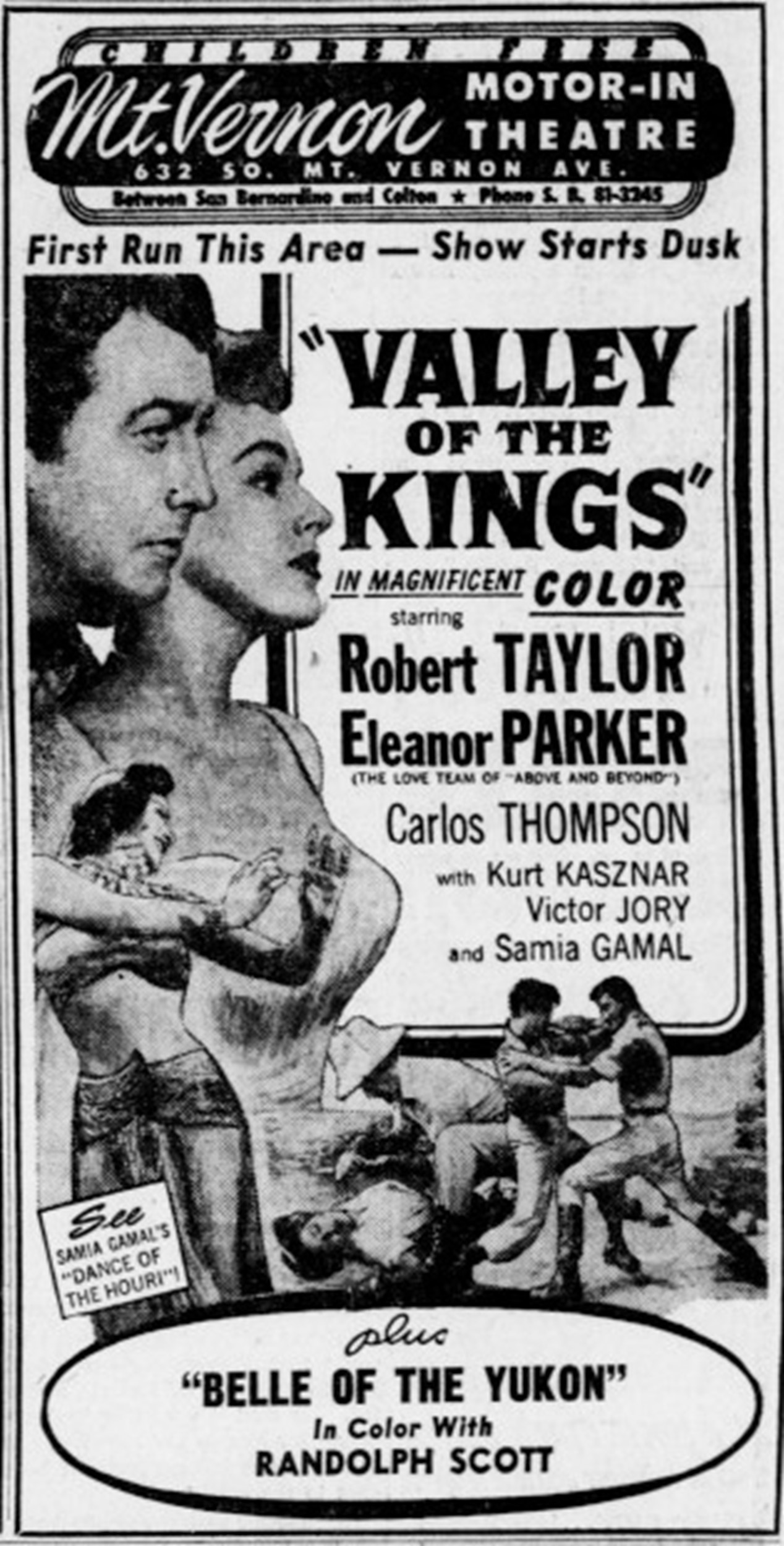
Drive-in advertisement from 1954.

The title of the film refers to the valley on the west bank of the Nile River in Egypt, where the tombs of the Ancient Egyptian kings are located.

The film was based on an original story by Robert Pirosh. It was bought by MGM who were attracted by a project similar to their highly successful adaptation of King Solomon's Mines (1950). They announced it in 1952 with Eleanor Parker attached from the beginning. There were a number of Egyptian themed projects in development in Hollywood at the time, others being The Egyptian and Serpent of the Nile. Sam Zimbalist was meant to produce and Vittorio Gassman was to co-star with Parker. Filming ended up being postponed a number of months. Gassman dropped out; Howard Keel was named as a possible replacement. Eventually the male lead was given to Robert Taylor, who had successfully teamed with Parker in Above and Beyond. Carlos Thompson played the second male lead.

Charles Schnee was the supervising producer.

MGM bought the rights to the archaeology text Gods, Graves and Scholars for "protection purposes", as it contained a chapter titled "Robbers in the Valley of the Kings", which might have been seen as having influenced the film's script. They paid a reported $25,000.

Filming started in November 1953. The film was shot on location in Egypt over six weeks in Cairo, Luxor, Faiyum, Suez, the Western Desert and at the Pyramids of Giza. Additional filming took place over the next five weeks in El Segundo, California and at MGM's studios.

Eleanor Parker recalled the film as the most difficult experience she ever had making a movie:

[It] was simply a dreadful nightmare. We had a terrible producer who made no accommodations for the company or crew on location. We were in Egypt, out in the desert filming, with no sanitary facilities, no dressing rooms to speak of, it was unbelievable. Robert Taylor and I had to use the bathrooms with the locals, hiding behind coats. Additionally, the director (Robert Pirosh) had no idea what he was doing; the head cameraman (Robert Surtees) was directing the film. Then the crew wasn't getting paid and our great cameraman told them that we were all going out on strike until everyone got paid. Believe me, the money showed up.

The film's world premiere took place simultaneously on 21 July 1954 in Cairo and Alexandria (as well as New York City). It marked the first time an American film had a world premiere in Egypt.

The film shows the Abu Simbel temples as they had existed for 3000 years, before they were relocated due to the construction of the Aswan High Dam.

== Reception ==
=== Box office ===
According to MGM records, the film earned $1,591,000 in the US and Canada and $1,714,000 elsewhere, resulting in a loss of $204,000.
