= Jérôme Phélypeaux =

French statesman

- Count of Pontchartrain
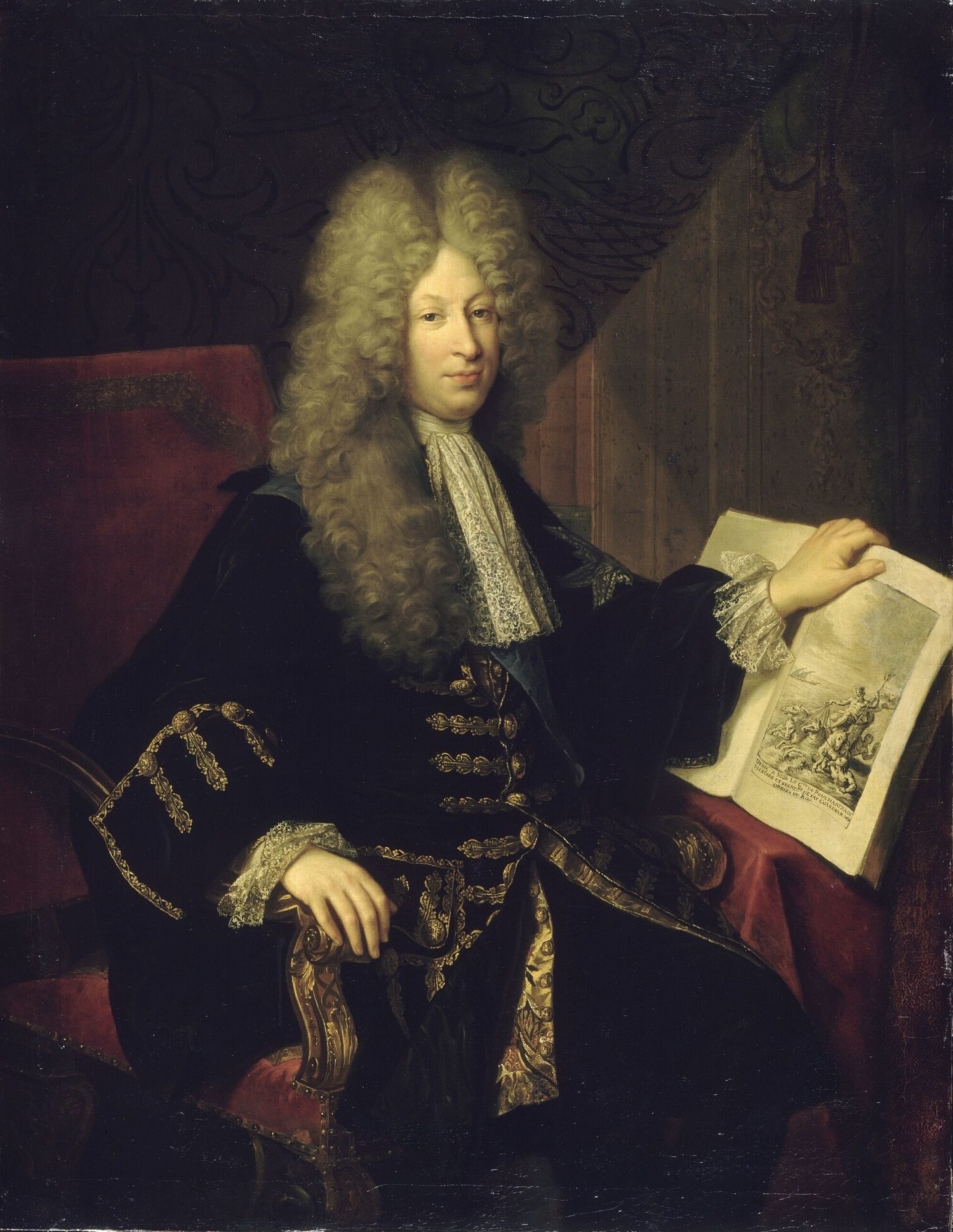
- Portrait of Jérôme Phélypeaux, comte de Pontchartrain

Secretary of State of the Navy
- Reign: 6 September 1699 - 1 October 1715
- Predecessor: Louis Phélypeaux
- Successor: Louis Alexandre de Bourbon

Secretary of State of the Maison du Roi
- Reign: 6 September 1699 - 7 November 1715
- Predecessor: Louis Phélypeaux
- Successor: Louis Phélypeaux
- Born: March 1674
- Died: 8 February 1747 (aged 72)
- Spouses: Éléonore Christine de La Rochefoucauld de Roye; Hélène de L'Aubespine
- Issue: Marie Françoise Christine; Louis François; Jean Frédéric; Paul Jérôme; Charles Henri; Marie Louise; Hélène Françoise Angélique
- House: Pontchartrain Branch of the House of Phélypeaux
- Father: Louis Phélypeaux
- Mother: Marie de Maupeou

Jérôme Phélypeaux, Count of Pontchartrain (March 1674 – 8 February 1747), comte de (count of) Pontchartrain, was a French statesman, son of Louis Phélypeaux and Marie de Maupeou.

== Biography ==
He served as a councillor to the parlement of Paris from 1692, and served as Secretary of State of the Maison du Roi and Navy Minister from 1699 onwards. His management of the French Navy was criticised, but recent historiography has reevaluated his contributions. He directed a significant programme of explorations and encouraged the settlement and development of Louisiana. He was responsible for the creation of the Académie des Inscriptions et Belles-Lettres.

== Private life ==
His first marriage, in 1697, was with Éléonore Christine de La Rochefoucauld de Roye (1681-1708) (known as Mademoiselle de Chefboutonne) (1681–June 1708). Five children were born to this marriage:

1. Marie Françoise Christine (1698–1701)
2. Louis François (1700–1708), comte de Maurepas
3. Jean Frédéric (1701–1781), Comte de Maurepas, later Comte de Pontchartrain
4. Paul Jérôme (1703– ?), marquis de Chefboutonne, a soldier
5. Charles Henri (1706–1734), bishop of Blois

He remarried in July 1713 with Hélène de L'Aubespine (1690–1770), with whom he had two daughters.

1. Marie Louise (known as Rosalie), (1714–1734), who married Emmanuel François Joseph, Count of Bavaria, illegitimate son of Maximilian II Emanuel, Elector of Bavaria, and his mistress, Countess Agnes Françoise Le Louchier.
2. Hélène Françoise Angélique (1715–1781), who married Louis Jules Mancini Mazarini, Duke of Nevers

In 1715, with the death of Louis XIV and the assumption of power by the Regent, Phélypeaux was compelled to resign his ministries in favour of his son Jean-Frédéric. Effective authority, and later the guardianship of his children, passed to his kinsman Louis Phélypeaux, Marquis of La Vrillière.

== See also ==
- Château de Pontchartrain

== Bibliography ==
- Sara E. Chapman, Private Ambition and Political Alliances the Phélypeaux de Pontchartrain Family and Louis XVI's Government, 1650-1715. Rochester N.Y. : University of Rochester Press, 2004. ISBN 1580461530.
- Charles Frostin, Les Pontchartrain, ministres de Louis XIV, Presses universitaires de Rennes, Rennes, 2006.
- Jean-Yves Nerzic, La place des armements mixtes dans la mobilisation de l'arsenal de Brest sous les deux Pontchartrain (1688-1697 & 1702-1713), Ed. H&D, 2010, ISBN 978-2-9142-6619-2.

Political offices
Preceded by Louis Phélypeaux	Secretary of State for the Navy; 6 September 1699 - 1 October 1715	Succeeded by Louis Alexandre de Bourbon, comte de Toulouse
