= Emmanuel François Joseph, Count of Bavaria =

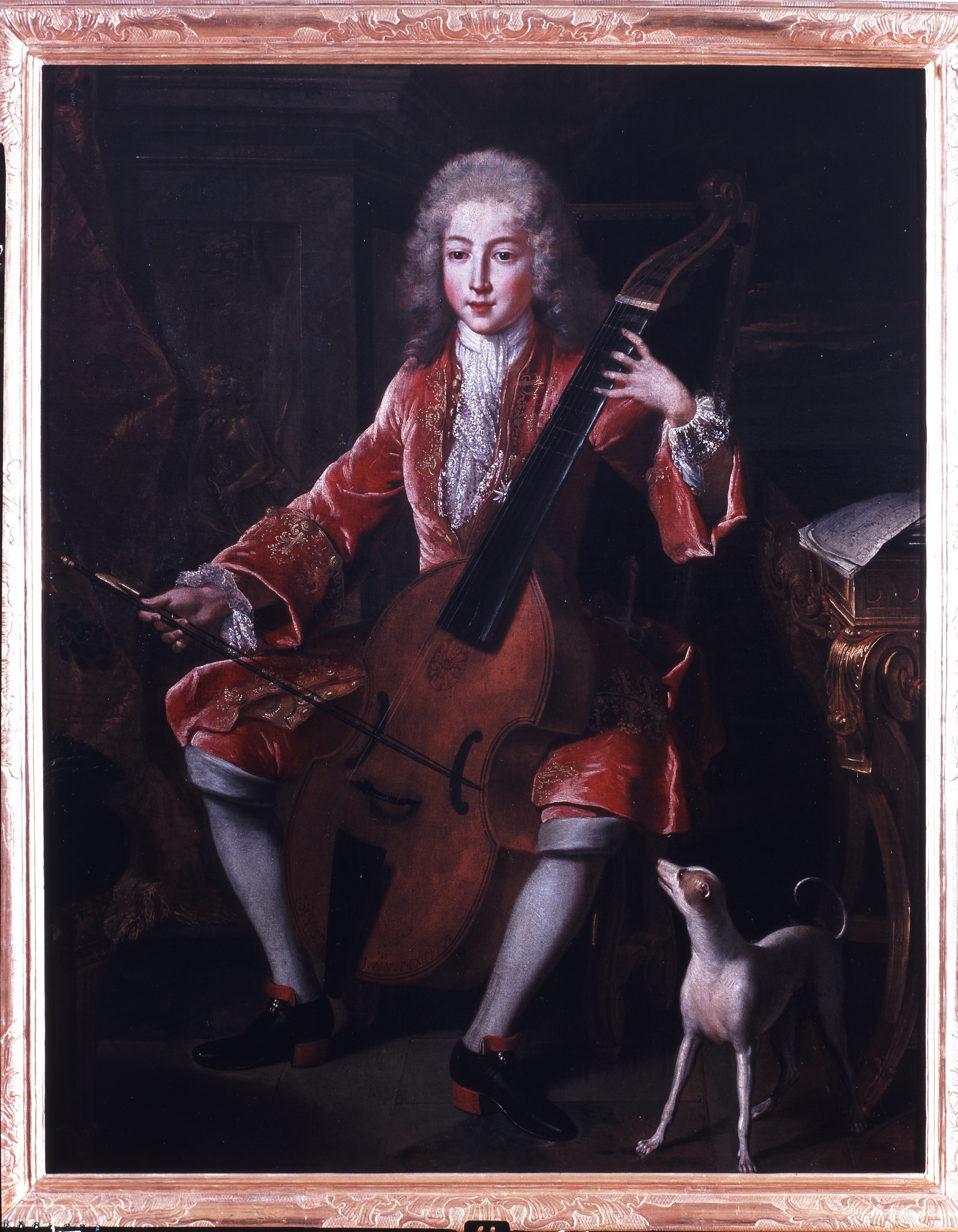
Portrait of the Count of Bavaria, by Louis de Silvestre, 1707

Emmanuel François Joseph von Wittelsbach, Count of Bavaria (17 May 1695 – 2 July 1747), also called Chevalier of Bavaria, Marquess of Villacerf, was a high-ranking officer and politician under King Louis XV of France. He served, among other positions, as Governor of Péronne in Picardy.

== Early life ==
Emmanuel François Joseph was born on 17 May 1695. He was the illegitimate son of Maximilian II Emanuel, Elector of Bavaria, and Countess Agnes Françoise Le Louchier. His father, a member of the House of Wittelsbach, had been married to Maria Antonia of Austria (daughter of Holy Roman Emperor Leopold I) from 1685 until her death in 1692. Before his birth, his father remarried to Theresa Kunegunda Sobieska of Poland, daughter of King John III Sobieski in 1694. He was, however, legitimized by his father as a Knight of Bavaria (Eques Bavariae) on 20 November 1695.

After a befitting education, he lived at his father's court during his period of exile from 1706 to 1715. There was an appointment as Count of Bavaria and a transfer of a sum of 400,000 livres, which was covered by the revenue of the County of The Hague.

== Career ==
During the War of the Spanish Succession, he was appointed Commander of the Régiment d'infanterie de Royal Bavière on 1 January 1709. He led it with the rank of Mestre de camp until 20 February 1734. In 1719, he was promoted to Brigadier des armées du roi. King Louis XIV made him a Knight of the Order of Saint John of Jerusalem, and in 1723, in Madrid, he was appointed Grandee of Spain, First Class by Philip V, the King of Spain. After his promotion to Maréchal de camp on 20 February 1734, he gave up active military service and transferred command of the regiment to his deputy. The regiment, however, continued to bear his name until 1740.

His Grand Tour took him to Malta, Florence and Rome. On 4 April 1725, his father bequeathed him the Bavarian coat of arms and the right to " be naturalized as a Frenchman" in order to improve his position at the French court. He also owned the Château de Saint-Cloud, with an annual annuity of 10,000 guilders.

=== War of the Austrian Succession ===
In 1742, he was appointed Governor of Prague by his half-brother, Charles Albert of Bavaria, who was elected Holy Roman Emperor on 24 January 1742. He was accredited as French Ambassador to the Electorate of Bavaria in Munich (alongside Théodore Chevignard de Chavigny). From 1743 to 1745, he was Ambassador to the Court of Vienna. In 1745, he became Governor of Péronne, Roy, and Montdidier. On 2 July 1747, he was killed by a cannonball in the Battle of Lauffeld during the War of the Austrian Succession.

== Personal life ==
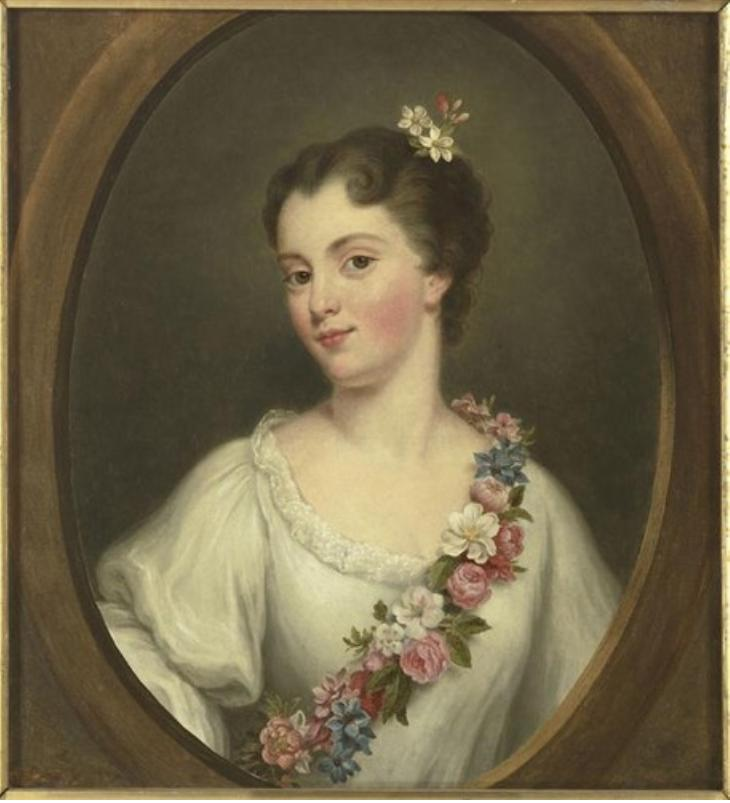
Louise Anne de Bourbon, called Mademoiselle de Charolais

In c. 1710, before he married, he was one of the numerous lovers of Princess Louise Anne de Bourbon, who was the same age as him. She was the daughter of Louis III de Bourbon, Prince of Condé (a grandson of le Grand Condé), and Princess Louise Françoise de Bourbon (the eldest surviving legitimised daughter of King Louis XIV and his maîtresse-en-titre, Madame de Montespan).

=== First marriage ===
In c. 1725, he married Marie-Louise "Rosalie" Phélypeaux (1714–1734), a daughter of Jérôme Phélypeaux, Count of Pontchartrain, and, his second wife, Hélène Françoise de L'Aubespine. Her father was the Secretary of State of the Navy and from his first marriage to Éléonore Christine de La Rochefoucauld de Roye, Rosalie was a younger half-sister of Jean Frédéric Phélypeaux, Count of Maurepas. She died aged 20 without issue.

=== Second marriage ===
In 1736, he married his niece, Countess Maria Josepha von Hohenfels (1720–1797), the illegitimate daughter of his half-brother, Charles VII, Holy Roman Emperor, and his lover, Baroness Maria Caroline Charlotte von Ingenheim. Together, they were the parents of:

- Marie Amélie Caroline Josèphe Francoise Xavière of Bavaria (1744–1820), Countess of Hohenfels, Marchioness of Villacerf; she married Armand Charles Emmanuel de Hautefort, Marquess of Sarcelles, in 1761.

The Count died on 2 July 1747 at the Battle of Lauffeld near Lauffeld.
