= Giovanni Battista Lampugnani (writer) =

Italian writer and correspondent

Giovanni Battista Lampugnani (flourished from 1690 to 1698) was an Italian writer of opera libretti and texts for oratorios. He also served as a correspondent for the Grand Duchy of Tuscany in Poland, Austria, and England during the 1690s.

== Life and career ==
Born in Florence, Italy the exact years of Giovanni Battista Lampugnani's birth and death are not known. He was in service to the Roman Catholic Cardinal Andrea Santacroce (1655–1712) in Warsaw from 1690 to 1696 and then in Vienna, Austria in 1697. He concurrently worked as a correspondent for the Grand Duchy of Tuscany from 1693 to 1698; finishing his service to the court in that capacity in London, England in 1698. After this the activities of Lampugnani are not known.

As a writer, Lampugnani penned the libretti for two drammi per musica composed to celebrate the weddings of the children of the Polish King John III Sobieski: Per goder in amor ci vuol costanza (1691; music by Viviano Augustini; written for the wedding of Prince James Louis Sobieski and Countess Palatine Hedwig Elisabeth of Neuburg) and the pastoral Amor vuol il giusto (1694; composer unknown; written for the marriage of Princess Theresa Kunegunda Sobieska and Maximilian II Emanuel, Elector of Bavaria). He also authored the text to two oratorios: Il transito di San Casimiro (1695; composer unknown) and La caduta d’Aman (1697; music by Raniero Borrini). His style as a writer for operas and oratorios is reminiscent of the Italian writer Arcangelo Spagna (1633-1726).
