= Louis Phélypeaux, Marquis of La Vrillière =

French statesman (1672–1725)

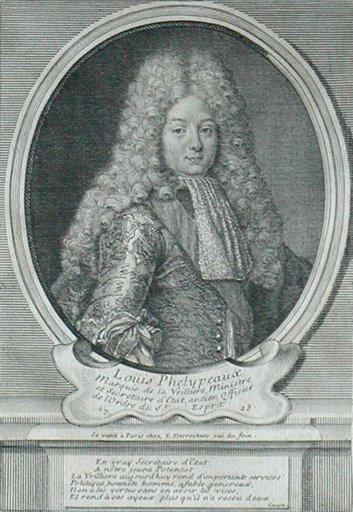
An engraving of Louis Phélypeaux, marquis de La Vrillière (1723).

Louis Phélypeaux, Marquis of La Vrillière (French: [lwi felipo]; 14 April 1672–7 September 1725) was a French statesman and nobleman.

He succeeded his father Balthazar Phélypeaux as minister for the "so-called Reformed religion", that is with responsibility for Huguenots in 1700. In 1715, when the Regent forced Phélypeaux's kinsman Jérôme Phélypeaux to resign his ministries in favour of Jérôme's son Jean Frédéric, Phélypeaux became acting head of the Department of the Maison du Roi and of Navy Ministry. He exercised control of the ministries from 1715 to 1718 when Jean-Frédéric took effective office.

He was succeeded as minister for Huguenot matters by his son, Louis.

He married Françoise de Mailly (1688–1742) in 1700. They had four children:

1. Anne Marie Phélypeaux (1702–1716)
2. Marie Jeanne Phélypeaux (1704–1793) married Jean Frédéric, Count of Maurepas, in 1718.
3. Louis (1705–1777), Count of Saint-Florentin, marquis (1725) and (1770) Duke of La Vrillière
4. Louise Françoise Phélypeaux (1707–1737) who married Louis de Bréhan de Plélo (1699–1734) French Ambassador to Denmark.

== See also ==
- Louis Phélypeaux (disambiguation)
- Phélypeaux
