= List of archaeology awards =

This list of archaeology awards is an index to articles on notable awards given for archaeology, the study of human activity through the recovery and analysis of material culture. View the individual articles for more detail.

== Awards ==
Country	Award	Sponsor	Description
United Kingdom & Ireland	Archaeological Achievement Awards	Council for British Archaeology	Various contributions to archaeology from UK and Ireland
United Kingdom	Archaeology Awards	Current Archaeology	Various contributions to archaeology
United Kingdom	Baggs Prize	Royal Archaeological Institute	Biennial prize for the best undergraduate dissertation on a subject concerning the archaeology or architectural history of Britain, Ireland and adjacent areas of Europe.
United Kingdom	Chalmers-Jervise Prize	Society of Antiquaries of Scotland	Biennial prize for the best paper on any subject in the prehistory or archaeology of Scotland before AD 1100 accepted for publication in the Proceedings of the Society of Antiquaries of Scotland.
Germany	Ceram Prize	Rheinisches Landesmuseum Bonn	Non-fiction books in archaeology
United States	Cornplanter Medal	Cayuga County Historical Society	Scholastic and other contributions to the betterment of knowledge of the Iroquois people
United States	Gold Medal Award for Distinguished Archaeological Achievement	Archaeological Institute of America	Scholar who has made distinguished contributions to archaeology through his or her fieldwork, publications, and/or teaching
United Kingdom	Grahame Clark Medal	British Academy	Academic achievement involving recent contributions to the study of prehistoric archaeology
United States	J. C. Harrington Award	Society for Historical Archaeology	Life-time of contributions to the discipline centered on scholarship
United Kingdom	Kenyon Medal	British Academy	Work in the field of classical studies and archaeology
United Kingdom	Martyn Jope Award	Society for Medieval Archaeology	"Best novel interpretation, application of analytical method or presentation of new findings"
United Kingdom	Peter Neaverson Award	Association for Industrial Archaeology	"Outstanding scholarship in industrial archaeology"
Canada	Smith-Wintemberg Award	Canadian Archaeological Association	Outstanding lifetime contributions to Canadian archaeology
Sweden	Viking Fund Medal	Wenner-Gren Foundation for Anthropological Research	Distinguishing research or publication in the field of Anthropology

== See also ==
- Lists of awards
- List of social sciences awards
