= Holnstein Palace =

Building in Munich, Germany

Coordinates: 48°08′28″N 11°34′30″E

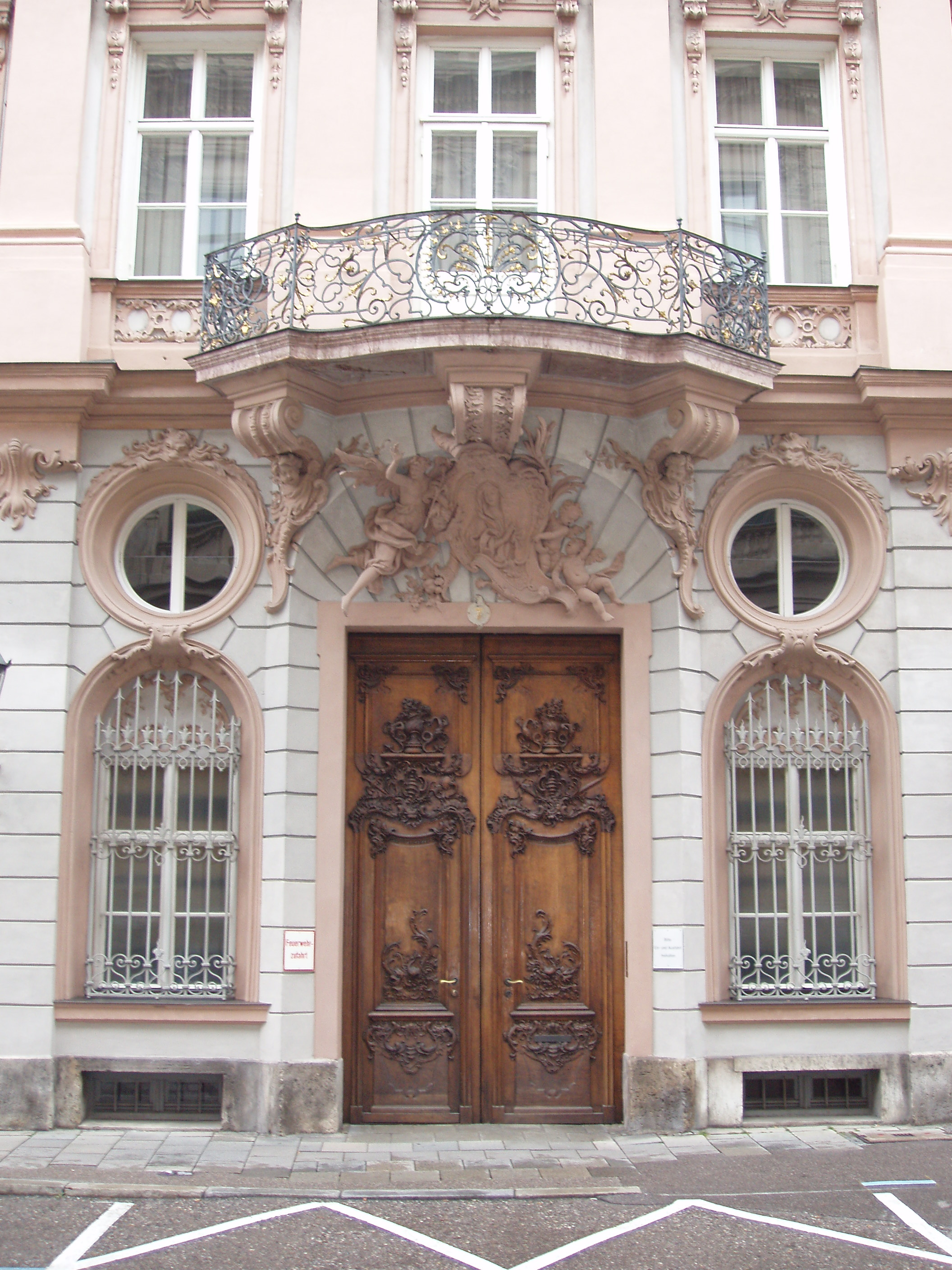
Portal of Palais Holnstein

Holnstein Palace (German: Palais Holnstein) is an historic building in Munich, Southern Germany, which has been the residence of the Archbishop of Munich and Freising since 1818.

== History ==
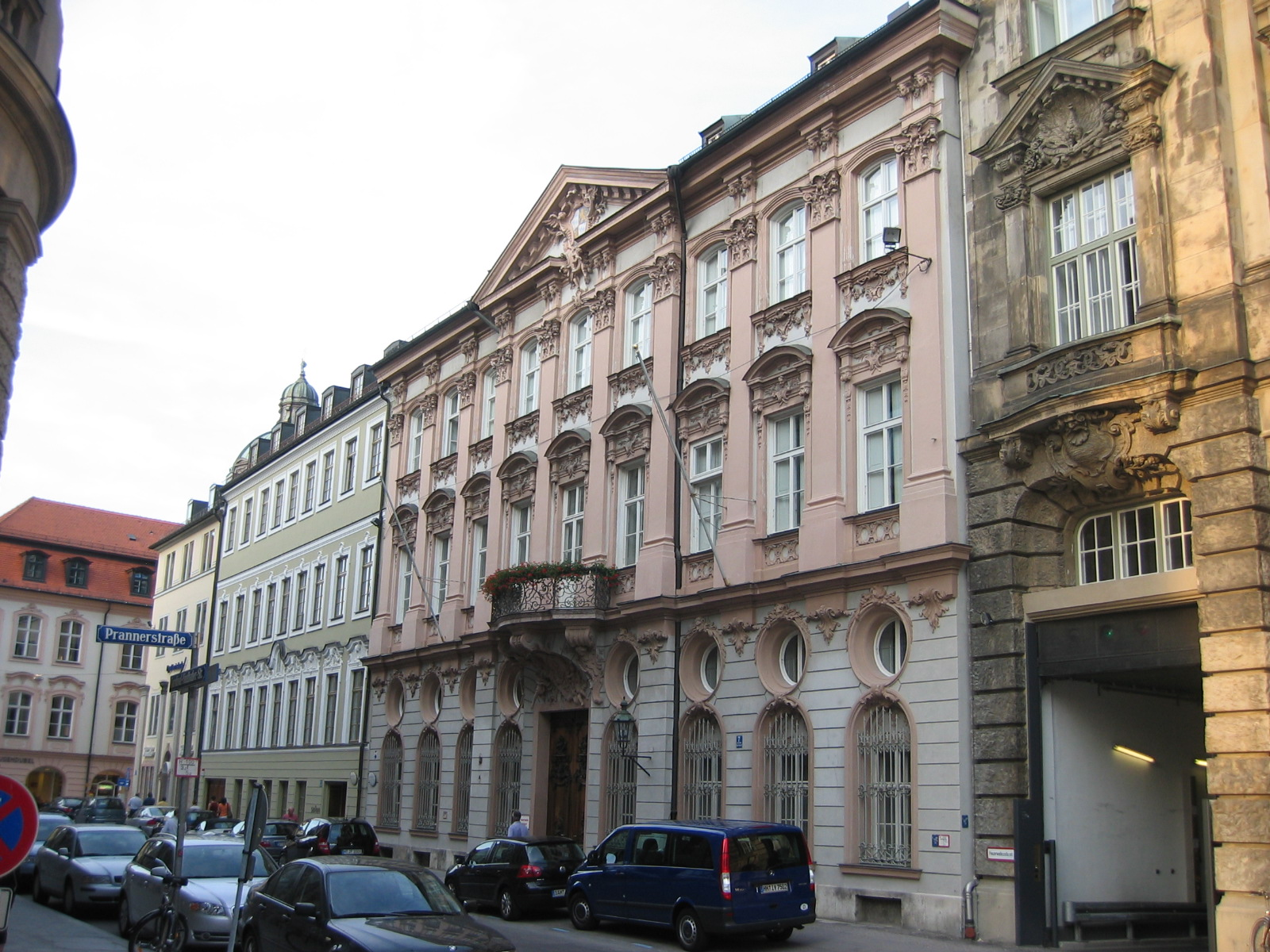
Palais Holnstein

The architect François de Cuvilliés built the mansion between 1733 and 1737 for Sophie Caroline von Ingenheim, Countess von Holnstein, a mistress of Charles VII, Holy Roman Emperor. It is today Munich's best rococo style palace as Cuvilliés' less conventional Palais Piosasque de Non was destroyed in World War II. The Holnstein Palace is designed as a four-winged building around a courtyard. The front house was used for representative purposes, while the rear building represented the privacy of the Count. The building is the only noble palace in Munich that kept the original layout. The rococo façade and many interiors have been preserved in their original state.

The façade layout shows three storeys and nine window bays, and a flat central avant-corps with a gable, as often seen in Munich since the time of Joseph Effner. The breakdown of window axes in three fields of three axes also corresponds to the internal division of main and side wings. The upper floors are divided by pilasters. The interior decoration was done by Johann Baptist Zimmermann. Only the elegant façade can be inspected since the palace is closed to the public.

From 1977 to 1982, the Palais Holnstein served as the residence of Archbishop Joseph Cardinal Ratzinger (later Pope Benedict XVI) who stayed here also during his visit in September 2006. The current Munich Archbishop Reinhard Marx lives in three rooms of the palace. Six and a half million Euros of the €8.7 million renovation cost (75%) of the palace were paid by the Free State of Bavaria in 2013.
