= Paul-Joseph Delcloche =

Flemish painter

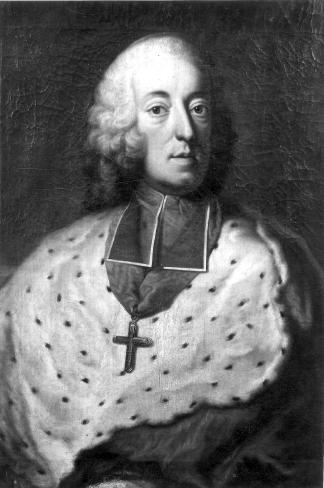
Black-and-white reproduction of the portrait of John Theodore of Bavaria from 1748

Paul-Joseph Delcloche, a Flemish painter of interiors and battle-pieces, was born at Namur (then in the Holy Roman Empire) on 20 January 1716. He was the son of Pierre Delcloche, an almost unknown painter, from whom he received his first lessons in art. Whilst still very young he went to Paris, but returned in 1747 to Liège, where he painted some pictures for the Salle des États and the churches. His small pictures are full of life and spirit, but his larger works are much less successful. He died on 24 May 1755 in Liège.
