= Marcus Junkelmann =

German historian and experimental archeologist

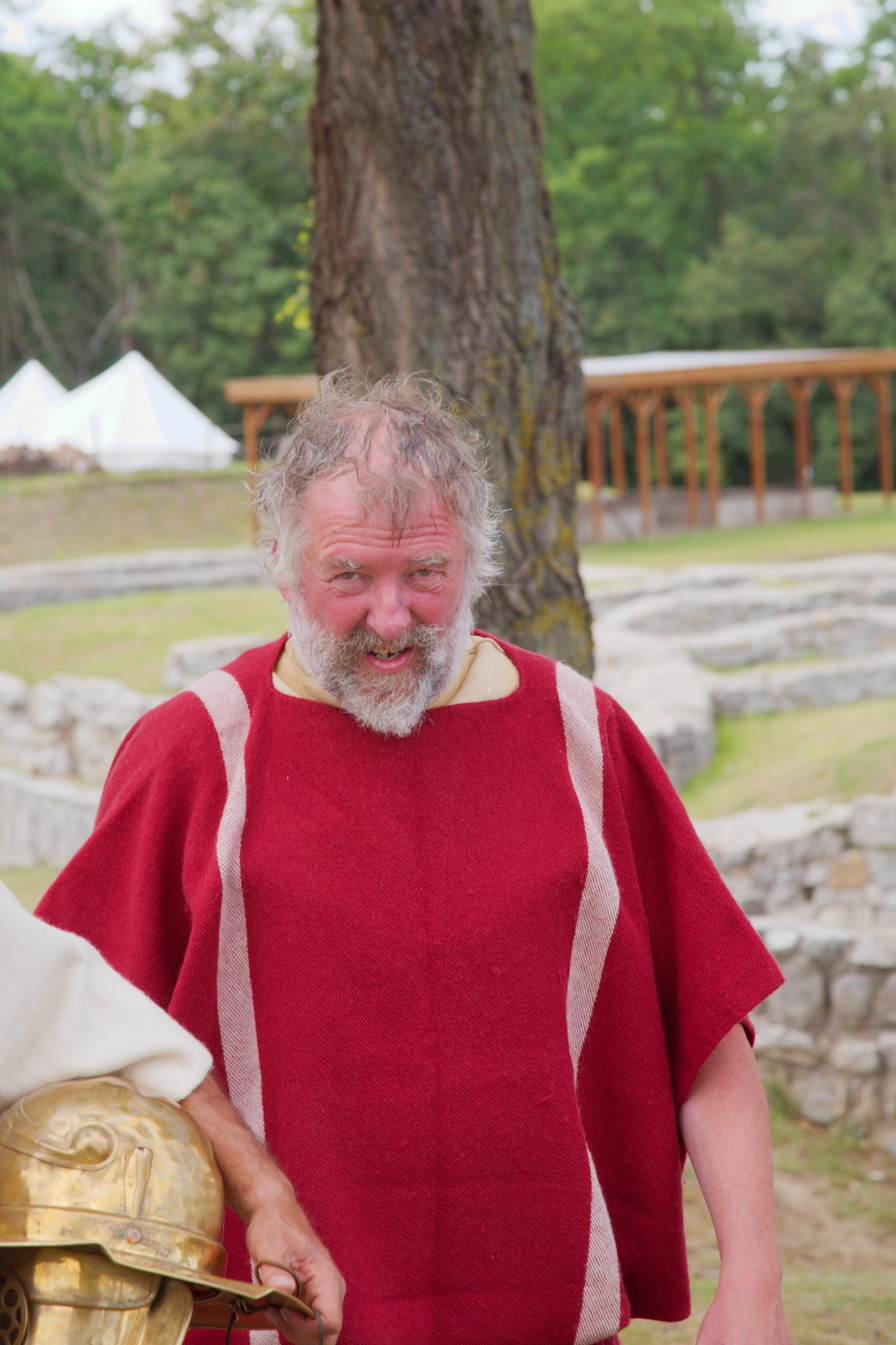
Marcus Junkelmann 2007

Marcus Junkelmann (born 2 October 1949 in Munich) is a German historian and experimental archeologist.

== Life and work ==
Junkelmann was born in Munich to the art historian Erich Junkelmann and his wife Charlotte. The family soon moved to Schleißheim and took residence in the Lustheim_Palace, where Junkelmann spent his youth. He graduated 1969 from the Dom-Gymnasium Freising (high school) and started to study history at LMU Munich in 1971. In 1979, he received his PhD for a thesis on the military achievements of Maximilian II (1662–1726) (original title: Kurfürst Max Emanuel von Bayern als Feldherr). After that he worked as an associate member of staff at the university and for the Bayerisches Armeemuseum (military museum) in Ingolstadt.

In the 1980s Junkelmann became well known in Germany for his work in experimental archeology. He reconstructed and tested Roman weapons and army gear. In 1985 in connection with the 2000-year celebration of the city of Augsburg he organized a large experimental reenactment of the life and work conditions of Roman legionaries. The experiment consisted of a month-long march from Verona to Augsburg including a crossing of the Alps. For the complete trip the original Roman army gear and equipment was used and the typical legionary tasks were performed. Later Junkelmann went on to perform similar experiments for the Roman cavalry. He authored several books and documentaries on his archeological experiments. In 1997, he was awarded the Ceram Prize for his book on the nutrition of Roman soldiers (original title: Panis militaris: Die Ernährung des römischen Soldaten oder der Grundstoff der Macht).

In 2012 Junkelmann was awarded the Bavarian Order of Merit.

== Works ==
=== Books & Papers ===
- Kurfürst Max Emanuel von Bayern als Feldherr, (Dissertation von 1979), Herbert Utz Verlag, München 2000 ISBN 3-89675-731-8
- Napoleon und Bayern. Von den Anfängen des Königreiches, Pustet, Regensburg 1984 ISBN 3-7917-0929-1
- Die Legionen des Augustus. Der römische Soldat im archäologischen Experiment, Verlag Philipp von Zabern, Mainz 1986 (Kulturgeschichte der antiken Welt, Bd. 33) ISBN 3-8053-0886-8
- Morgenröte am Potomac: Der amerikanische Bürgerkrieg, Schweizer Verlagshaus, Zürich 1987 ISBN 3-7263-6520-6
- Nach dem Sturm: Aufbruch einer Nation: Die USA nach dem Bürgerkrieg, Schweizer Verlagshaus, Zürich 1990, ISBN 3-7263-6585-0
- Die Reiter Roms. Teil 1, Reise, Jagd, Triumph und Circusrennen, von Zabern, Mainz 1990 (Kulturgeschichte der antiken Welt, Bd. 45) ISBN 3-8053-1006-4 (Neuauflage 2008)
- Die Reiter Roms. Teil 2, Der militärische Einsatz, von Zabern, Mainz 1991 (Kulturgeschichte der antiken Welt, Bd. 49) ISBN 3-8053-1139-7 (Neuauflage 2008)
- Die Reiter Roms. Teil 3, Zubehör, Reitweise, Bewaffnung, von Zabern, Mainz 1992 (Kulturgeschichte der antiken Welt, Bd. 53) ISBN 3-8053-1288-1 (Neuauflage 2008)
- Der amerikanische Bürgerkrieg 1861 - 1865, Weltbild-Verlag, Augsburg 1992 ISBN 3-89350-355-2
- Die Eroberung des Westens. Die USA nach dem Bürgerkrieg 1865 - 1890, Weltbild-Verlag, Augsburg 1993 ISBN 3-89350-561-X
- Gustav Adolf (1594-1632): Schwedens Aufstieg zur Großmacht, Pustet, Regensburg, 1993 ISBN 3-7917-1397-3
- Dollinger - Das Buch zum Spiel, Verlag der Mittelbayerischen Zeitung, Regensburg, 1995
- Reiter wie Statuen aus Erz, Verlag Philipp von Zabern, Mainz 1996 (Zaberns Bildbände zur Archäologie / Antike Welt, Sonderband) ISBN 3-8053-1821-9
- Panis militaris. Die Ernährung des römischen Soldaten oder der Grundstoff der Macht, Verlag Philipp von Zabern, Mainz 1997 (Kulturgeschichte der antiken Welt, Bd. 75) ISBN 3-8053-2332-8
- Römische Helme (mit Beiträgen von John Pollini und Günther E. Thüry, hrsg. von Hermann Born), Sammlung Axel Guttmann, Verlag Philipp von Zabern, Mainz 2000 ISBN 3-8053-1670-4
- Römische Kampf- und Turnierrüstungen, Sammlung Axel Guttmann (zusammen mit Hermann Born), Verlag Philipp von Zabern, Mainz 1997 ISBN 3-8053-1668-2
- Arte & Marte Theatrum belli. Die Schlacht bei Höchstädt 1704 und die Schlösser von Schleißheim und Blenheim, Bautz, Traugott, Herzfeld 2000 ISBN 3-88309-083-2
- Aus dem Füllhorn Roms. 34 Originalrezepte aus der römischen Küche, Verlag Philipp von Zabern, Mainz 2000 ISBN 3-8053-2686-6
- Das Spiel mit dem Tod. So kämpften Roms Gladiatoren, Verlag Philipp von Zabern, Mainz 2000 (Zaberns Bildbände zur Archäologie) ISBN 3-8053-2563-0 (Neuauflage 2008)
- Hollywoods Traum von Rom. "Gladiator" und die Tradition des Monumentalfilms, von Verlag Philipp von Zabern, Mainz 2004 (Kulturgeschichte der antiken Welt, Bd. 94) ISBN 3-8053-2905-9
- Das greulichste Spectaculum. Die Schlacht von Höchstädt 1704. Hefte zur Bayerischen Geschichte und Kultur Bd. 30, hrsg. vom Haus der Bayerischen Geschichte 2004, ISBN 3-927233-90-0
- Was ist was: Gladiatoren. Kämpfer der Arena (für Kinder), Tessloff Verlag, Nürnberg 2005 ISBN 3-7886-0422-0

=== Video documentaries ===
- Bilder aus der deutschen Vergangenheit. Der deutsche Soldat (Bayerischer Rundfunk, 1986 – zahlreiche Wiederholungen)
- Der Römerschatz von Sorviodurum. Das Gäubodenmuseum Straubing (Landesstelle für die nichtstaatlichen Museen/Bayerischer Rundfunk, 1994)
- Gerichte mit Geschichte. Römische Küche im alten Bayern. Film von Werner Teufl und Dr. Marcus Junkelmann (Bayerisches Fernsehen, 2000 – auch als Video)
