= Johann Theodor of Bavaria =

Prince-Bishop of Freising from 1723 to 1763

His Eminence Johann Theodor of Bavaria
- Prince-Bishop of Regensburg
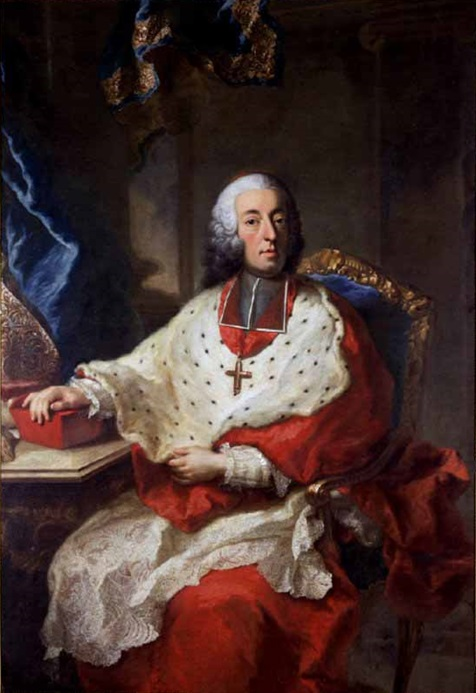
- Portrait by Georg Desmarées
- Church: Roman Catholic Church
- Diocese: Regensburg
- See: Regensburg
- Elected: 29 July 1719
- Term ended: 27 January 1763
- Predecessor: Clemens August of Bavaria
- Successor: Clemens Wenceslaus of Saxony
- Other posts: Prince-Bishop of Freising (1723–1763); Cardinal-Priest of San Lorenzo in Panisperna (1746–1763); Prince-Bishop of Liège (1746–1763)

Orders
- Ordination: 8 April 1730 (priest)
- Consecration: 1 October 1730 (bishop) by Clemens August of Bavaria
- Created cardinal: 9 September 1743 by Pope Benedict XIV
- Rank: Cardinal-Priest

Personal details
- Born: Johann Theodor von Bayern; 3 September 1703 Munich
- Died: 27 January 1763 (aged 59) Liège
- Buried: Saint Lambert's Cathedral, Liège
- Parents: Maximilian II Emanuel (father); Theresa Kunegunda Sobieska (mother)

Johann Theodor of Bavaria (3 September 1703 – 27 January 1763) was an 18th-century cardinal who served as the Prince-Bishop of Regensburg, Prince-Bishop of Freising, and the Prince-Bishop of Liège.

== Early life ==
Johann Theodor was the son of Maximilian II Emanuel and of his wife Theresa Kunegunda Sobieska (daughter of King John III Sobieski of Poland). He was educated at the University of Ingolstadt in Bavaria and at the University of Siena.

== Ecclesiastical career ==
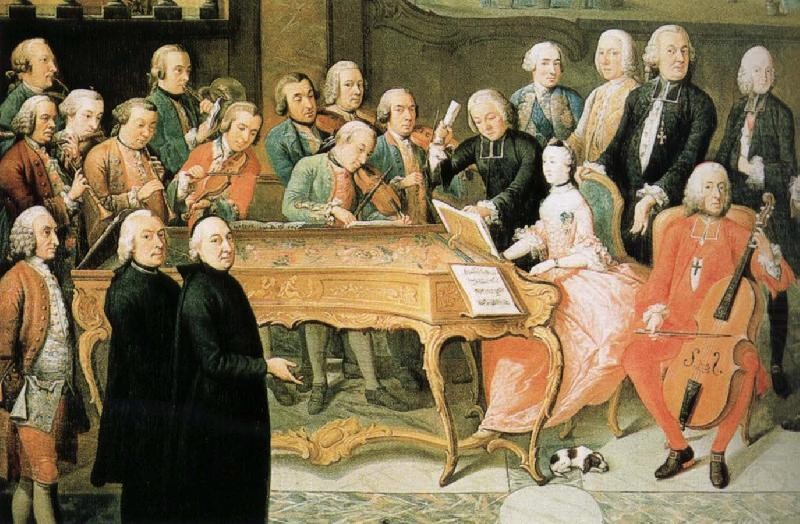
Johann Theodor playing the cello at chateau de Seraing (by Paul-Joseph Delcloche).

Johann Theodor was elected bishop of Regensburg by its cathedral chapter on 29 July 1719, at age 15. The election received papal confirmation on 14 October 1721. He was elected coadjutor bishop of Freising by its cathedral chapter on 5 November 1723. The election received papal confirmation on 12 April 1726, and he was permitted to retain the see of Regensburg.

Johann Theodor was ordained subdeacon in 1724. He was ordained priest on 8 April 1730. After receiving a papal dispensation on 4 August 1730 to receive episcopal consecration before the canonically required age (he was only 27 years old), he was consecrated bishop on 1 October 1730, in the cathedral of Münster, by his brother Clemens August of Bavaria, Archbishop and Elector of Cologne, assisted by Johann Adolf von Horde, titular bishop of Flaviopoli, and by Ferdinand Oesterhof, titular bishop of Agatonice.

On 9 September 1743 Johann Theodor was created a Cardinal-Priest by Pope Benedict XIV, but his name was reserved in pectore and was not announced until 17 January 1746. On 27 April 1746 he received the cardinalatial title of San Lorenzo in Panisperna.

On 23 January 1744 Johann Theodor was elected Prince-Bishop of Liège by the cathedral chapter. The election received papal confirmation on 12 February 1744, and he was permitted to retain the sees of Regensburg and Freising.

Johann Theodor did not participate in the conclave of 1758 following the death of Pope Benedict XIV. He was the last representative of the House of Wittelsbach to occupy the bishopric of Liège. In March 1761, shortly after the death of his elder brother Clemens August, Pope Clement XIII rejected his succession as Archbishop and Elector of Cologne because the pope entertained some doubt as to Johann Theodor's moral conduct.

Johann Theodor was known as a great hunter, patron of music (he played the violoncello) and theatre, and held a splendid court at Liège. He was said to have had affairs with several women despite his clerical status and was liked by the inhabitants of the bishopric. Asthmatic and tubercular, he gave in to the advice of his doctor, a physician named Steppler (a German from Munich), who claimed that his sickness originated from coal vapours. He thus went for regular stays in Germany, though this did not improve his health.

== Death ==
Johann Theodor died on 27 January 1763, in Liège, Belgium. He was buried in Saint-Lambert Cathedral in Liège while his heart was placed in the Chapel of Grace in the Shrine of Our Lady of Altötting.

== Bibliography ==
- A. De Bryun, Anciennes houillères de la région liégeoises, Dricot, Liège, 1988 (ISBN 2-87095-056-X).

Johann Theodor of Bavaria House of Wittelsbach Born: 3 September 1703 in Munich Died: 27 January 1763 in Liège
Catholic Church titles
Preceded by Clemens August of Bavaria	Prince-Bishop of Regensburg; 1719 – 1763	Succeeded by Clemens Wenceslaus of Saxony
Preceded by Johann Franz Eckher von Kapfing und Liechteneck	Prince-Bishop of Freising; 1727 – 1763	Succeeded by Clemens Wenceslaus of Saxony
Preceded by Georges-Louis de Berghes	Prince-Bishop of Liège; 1744 – 1763	Succeeded by Charles-Nicolas d'Oultremont
