= MV Philips Wouwerman =

1942 British cargo ship

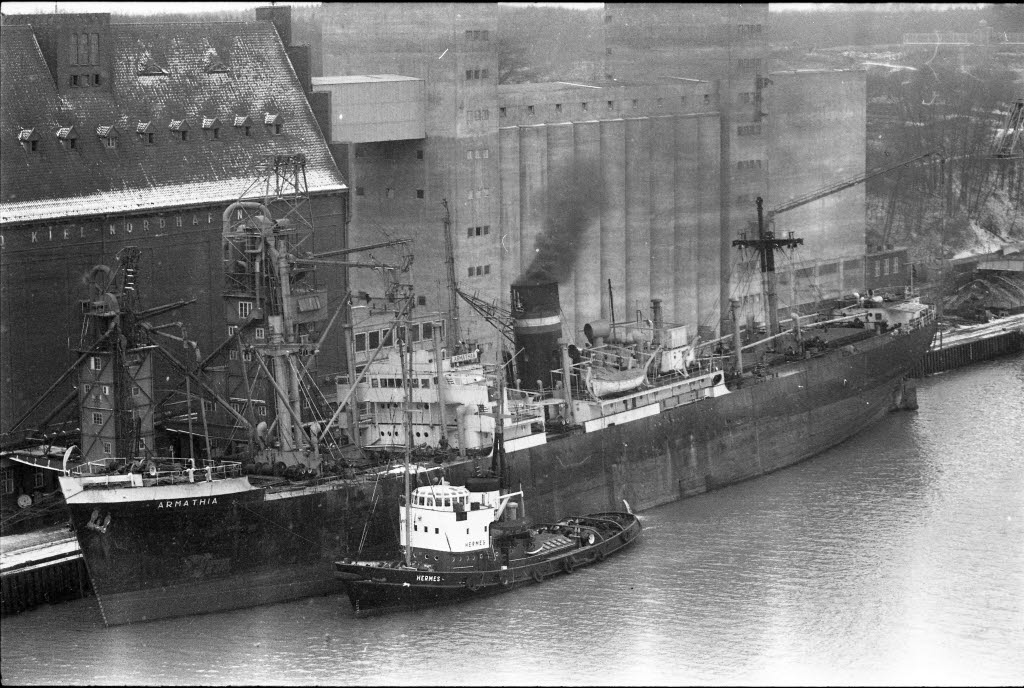
- Armathia at Kiel, March 1964.

History
- Name: Empire Courage (1942–43); Philips Wouwerman (1943–47); Ceram (1947–53); Amsteltoren (1953); Amstelbrug (1953–59); Armathia (1959–65); Calliman (1965–68)
- Owner: Ministry of War Transport (1943); Dutch Government (1943–47); NV Stoomscheep Maatschappij Nederland (1947–53); Amsterdam NV Rederei (1953–59); Compagnia Navigazione Alameda SA (1959–65); Velamar Compagnia Navigazione (1965–68)
- Operator: P Henderson & Co Ltd (1943); Netherland Shipping & Trading Committee Ltd (1943–47); NV Stoomscheep Maatschappij Nederland (1947–53); Amsterdam NV Rederei (1953–59); Compagnia Navigazione Alameda SA (1959–65); Velamar Compagnia Navigazione (1965–68)
- Port of registry: (United Kingdom) Glasgow (1942–43); (Netherlands) The Hague (1943–59); Greece (1959–68)
- Builder: Barclay, Curle & Co Ltd
- Yard number: 689
- Launched: 21 December 1942
- Completed: 1943
- Maiden voyage: 26 March 1943
- In service: 1943
- Out of service: February 1961
- Identification: United Kingdom Official Number 168753 (1943); Code Letters BFDJ (1943); Code Letters PCPG (1943–59); IMO number: 502468 (–1968)
- Fate: Scrapped

General characteristics
- Tonnage: 7,089 GRT; 4,181 NRT; 10,081 DWT
- Length: 418 ft 0 in (127.41 m)
- Beam: 57 ft 4 in (17.48 m)
- Draught: 27 ft 6 1/2 in (8.395 m)
- Depth: 34 ft 2 in (10.41 m)
- Propulsion: 2 x SCSA Diesel engines
- Armament: Anti torpedo nets (1945)

Philips Wouwerman was a 7,091 GRT cargo ship that was built in 1942 as Empire Courage by Barclay, Curle & Co Ltd, Glasgow, United Kingdom. She was built for the Ministry of War Transport. in 1943, she was transferred to the Dutch Government and renamed Philips Wouwerman. In 1947, she was sold into merchant service and renamed Ceram. A further sale in 1953 saw her renamed Amsteltoren and then Amstelbrug. In 1959, she was sold to Greece and renamed Armathia. A further sale in 1965 saw her renamed Calliman. She served until scrapped in 1968.

== Description ==
The ship was built in 1942 by Barclay, Curle & Co Ltd, Glasgow. Launched on 21 December, she was yard number 689.

The ship was 418 feet 0 inches (127.41 m) long, with a beam of 57 feet 4 inches (17.48 m). She had a depth of 34 feet 2 inches (10.41 m), and a draught of 27 ft 6 1/2 in (8.395 m). She was assessed at 7,089 GRT, 4,181 NRT. Her DWT was 10,081.

The ship was powered by two 687 nhp 2-stroke, Single Cycle Single Action diesel engines, which had four cylinders of 23 5/8 inches (60 cm) bore by 91 5/16 inches (231.9 cm) stroke. The engines were built by Barclay, Curle & Co Ltd, Glasgow.

== History ==
Empire Courage was allocated the United Kingdom Official Number 168753 and the Code Letters BFDJ. Her port of registry was Glasgow and she was operated under the management of P Henderson & Co Ltd. She was transferred to the Dutch Government on 23 February 1943 and renamed Philips Wouwerman. Her port of registry was The Hague and the Code Letters PCPG were allocated. She was operated under the management of the Netherland Shipping & Trading Committee Ltd.

Philips Wouwerman departed from the Clyde on 26 March 1943, joining Convoy OS 45, which had departed from Liverpool, Lancashire on 24 March and arrived at Freetown, Sierra Leone on 14 April. She was carrying general cargo. She joined Convoy NC 10, which departed Walvis Bay, South West Africa on 29 April and arrived at Cape Town, South Africa.Philips Wouwerman then joined Convoy CD 17, which departed Cape Town on 7 May and arrived at Durban on 12 May. she then joined Convoy DN 40, which departed Durban on 19 May and dispersed at sea on 21 May.

Philips Wouwerman was a member of Convoy MB 61, which departed Colombo, Ceylon on 10 January 1944 and arrived at Bombay, India on 15 January. She was a member of Convoy SL 154, which departed Freetown on 1 April and merged with Convoy MKS 45 at sea on 11 April. The combined convoy arrived at Liverpool on 23 April. Philips Wouwerman was carrying a cargo of wheat. She left the convoy at Loch Eweon 23 April, joining Convoy WN 574, which departed that day and arrived at Methil, Fife on 25 April.

Philips Wouwerman was a member of Convoy OS 80 km which departed from Liverpool on 11 June and split at sea on 21 June. She was in the portion of the convoy which became Convoy KMS 54G and arrived at Gibraltar on 23 June. Philips Wouwerman then joined Convoy KMS 54, which departed Gibraltar that day and arrived at Port Said, Egypt on 3 July. She was carrying general cargo.

Philips Wouwerman was a member of Convoy HX 325, which departed New York, United States on 9 December and arrived at Liverpool on 23 December. She was carrying explosives and general cargo.

Philips Wouwerman was a member of Convoy ON 284, which departed from Southend, Essex on 10 February 1945 and arrived at New York on 1 March. She was fitted with anti-torpedo nets. Philips Wouwerman returned to the United Kingdom with Convoy HX 345, which departed New York on 19 March and arrived at Liverpool on 2 April. She was carrying general cargo. She then sailed to Southend to join Convoy TAM 128, which departed on 4 April and arrived at Antwerp, Belgium on 5 April. She returned with Convoy ATM 122, which departed Antwerp on 12 April and arrived at Southend that day. She then made a voyage to Rotterdam, Netherlands with a cargo of foodstuff. Her final convoy of the war was Convoy ON 298, which departed Southend on 21 April and arrived at New York on 7 May.

On 4 December 1947, she was sold to NV Stoomscheep Maatschappij Nederland and renamed Ceram. On 17 April 1953, she was sold to Amsterdam NV Reederij, Amsterdam and was renamed Amsteltoren. In September that year, she was renamed Amstelbrug. In May 1959, she was sold to Compagnia Navigazione Alameda SA, Greece and was renamed Armathia. In 1965, she was sold to Velamar Compagnia Navigazione, Greece and was renamed Calliman. With the introduction of IMO Numbers in the 1960s, Calliman was allocated the number 502468. She served until 1968, arriving on 1 April at Kaohsiung, Taiwan for scrapping.
