= Ceram Prize =

Prize for archaeological books

The Ceram Prize (German: Ceram-Preis) is a prize for non-fiction books in archaeology issued by Rheinisches Landesmuseum Bonn. It is named for C. W. Ceram, famous for his popularization of archaeology.

== Recipients ==
The prize has been awarded in irregular intervals.

- 1974 - Rudolf Pörtner
- 1980 - Lübbe-Verlag for Neue Entdeckungen der Archäologie
- 1992 - Wolfgang Wurster for Die Schatz-Gräber. Archäologische Expeditionen durch die Hochkulturen Südamerikas, Hamburg 1991 ISBN 3-570-01000-7
- 1998 - Marcus Junkelmann for Panis militaris. Die Ernährung des römischen Soldaten oder der Grundstoff der Macht, Mainz 1997 ("Kulturgeschichte der antiken Welt", vol. 75) ISBN 3-8053-2332-8
- 2002 - Franco Falchetti and Antonella Romualdi for Die Etrusker, Theiss, Stuttgart 2001 ISBN 3-8062-1630-4

== See also ==
- List of archaeology awards
- List of literary awards
