= Theresa Kunegunda Sobieska =

Electress of Bavaria from 1695 to 1726

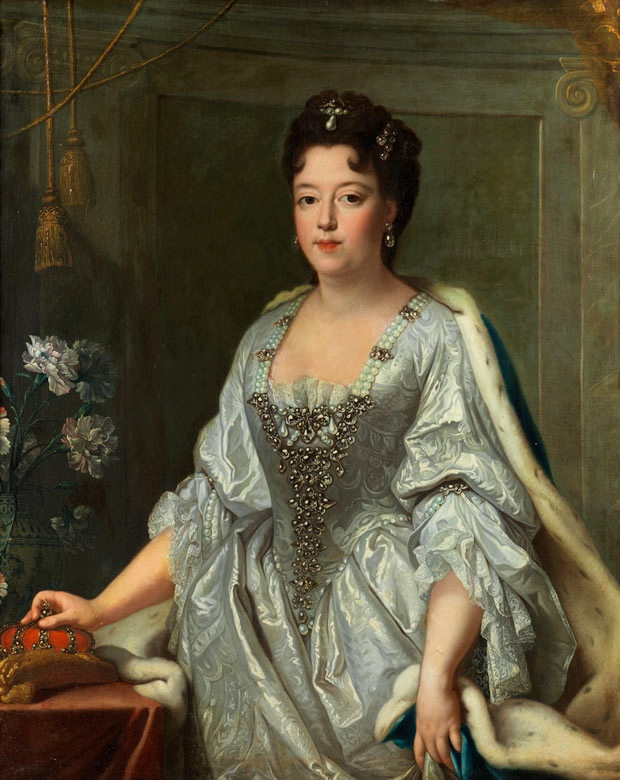
- Portrait c. 1720

Electress consort of Bavaria
- Tenure: 2 January 1695 – 26 February 1726
- Born: 4 March 1676; Wilanów, Poland, Polish–Lithuanian Commonwealth
- Died: 27 March 1730 (aged 54); Venice, Republic of Venice
- Burial: Theatine Church
- Spouse: Maximilian II Emanuel (m. 1694; died 1726)
- Issue Detail: Charles VII, Holy Roman Emperor; Ferdinand Maria Innocent; Clemens August; Johann Theodor; Maria Anna Karoline; Philip Maurice Maria; William, Prince of Bavaria; Alois John Adolf; Maximilian Emanuel Thomas
- House: Sobieski
- Father: John III Sobieski
- Mother: Marie Casimire d'Arquien

Theresa Kunegunda (Polish: Teresa Kunegunda Sobieska, German: Kurfürstin Therese Kunigunde, French: Thérèse-Cunégonde Sobieska) (4 March 1676 – 27 March 1730) was a Polish princess, Electress of Bavaria and of the Electorate of the Palatinate. By birth, she was a member of the House of Sobieski and by marriage, she was also a member of the House of Wittelsbach. She served as Regent of the Palatinate in 1704–1705.

== Biography ==
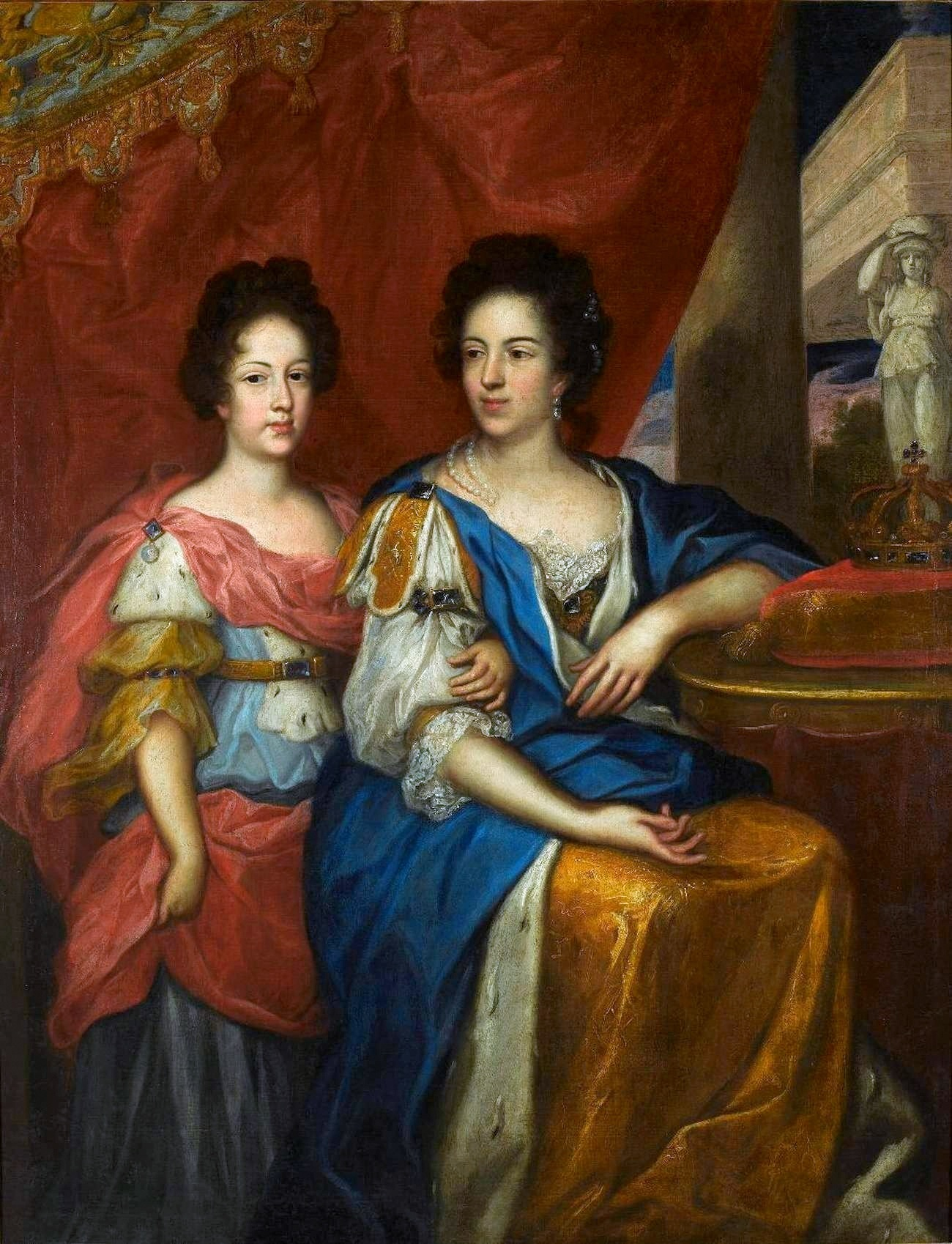
Theresa Kunegunda with her mother Marie Casimire (portrait by Jerzy Siemiginowski-Eleuter, c. 1690

Born on 4 March 1676, she was the daughter of the King of Poland and Grand Duke of Lithuania John III Sobieski and Marie Casimire d'Arquien. While her parents had 13 children, she was the only daughter to survive childhood.

Theresa was baptised in Jaworów on 19 July, having for her godfather Charles II, king of England and for her godmother Marie-Thérèse of Austria, wife of Louis XIV, both by proxy.

Theresa was educated in painting and music, Latin, Italian and French. At the beginning of 1692, her father planned to marry her to the Crown Prince of Denmark, but this project was subsequently abandoned.

=== Wedding ===
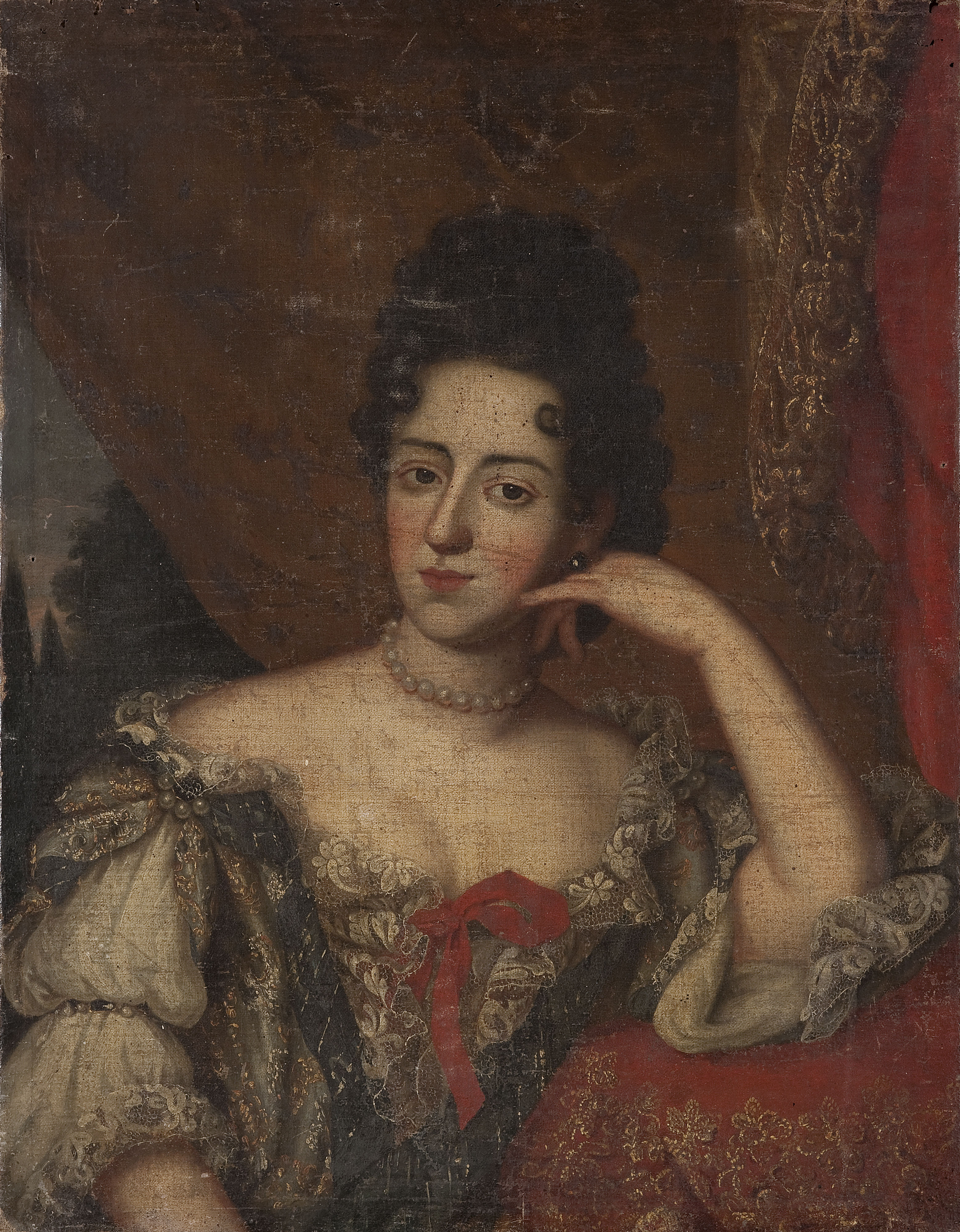
Portrait by Jerzy Siemiginowski-Eleuter, c. 1695

On 15 August 1694, at the age of 19, she married Maximilian II Emanuel, elector of Bavaria, governor of the Spanish Netherlands. He was a former comrade in arms of her father and widower of Maria Antonia of Austria. The marriage took place by proxy in Warsaw, her oldest brother standing in for Max Emanuel. She would not meet the latter until 1 January 1695 in Brussels. Her journey, paid for by her mother, lasted approximately 50 days and was accompanied by splendors. Her dowry was 500,000 thalers. In honor of her wedding to Max Emanuel, the opera Amor vuol il giusto was created and staged. It used a libretto by the Italian writer Giovanni Battista Lampugnani.

=== Regency ===
In the Spanish Netherlands, Theresa gave birth to six children before the family moved to Munich in May 1701. Following the evacuation of the Bavarian court from the Spanish Netherlands after the defeat of the Battle of Blenheim (13 August 1704), she became Regent of the Government of the Elector of Bavaria. The move was smart since, legally, the war was against the Elector and not Theresa. It was the only time a woman ruled the Bavarian Electorate. However, Emperor Leopold I forced her to sign the Treaty of Ilbersheim on 5 November 1704. This included a cease-fire and gave Theresa the Munich Rentamt, one of the four administrative districts of the Duchy of Bavaria, while the rest of Bavaria is placed under the military supervision of the Austrian Empire. At the beginning of this phase, Theresa strove to decide in collaboration with Max Emanuel but the courier took too long for this to be effective. She also had to face the defection of part of the Bavarian nobility in favour of the emperor.

=== Exile ===
On 21 December 1704, she gave birth to the last of her sons. In February 1705, she left to meet her mother in Padua following the discovery of written correspondence between her husband and Agnès Le Louchier, the Countess of Arco, his mistress. Upon her return in May, the imperial army would not allow her to return to Munich, in violation of the treaty of Ilbersheim. Her four sons were looked after by the Austrians in Klagenfurt while her two youngest ones and her daughter remained in Munich.

After the Battle of Ramillies on 23 May 1706, Max Emanuel was forced to flee the Spanish Netherlands and found refuge at the court of France located in Versailles. Max Emmanuel would live with his French mistress Agnes Le Louchier during his exile from 1704 to 1715.

Theresa negotiated her return to Munich from the Emperor by asking for the help of the Republic of Venice, Pope Clement XI, Prince Eugene of Savoy and Anne, Queen of Great Britain. She tried to use the Duke of Modena and the Grand Duchess of Tuscany as mediators, but to no avail. On the domestic level, the financial and military retributions imposed by Joseph I created many revolts and she lost a son. Consequently, Theresa spent ten years in exile in Venice, not returning until 1715 when the War of the Spanish Succession ended and Max Emanuel regained his electorate on 7 September 1714 by the Treaty of Baden. Despite a short reign of seven months, Theresa left a positive balance; in particular, the role of the nobility was improved.

=== Later life ===
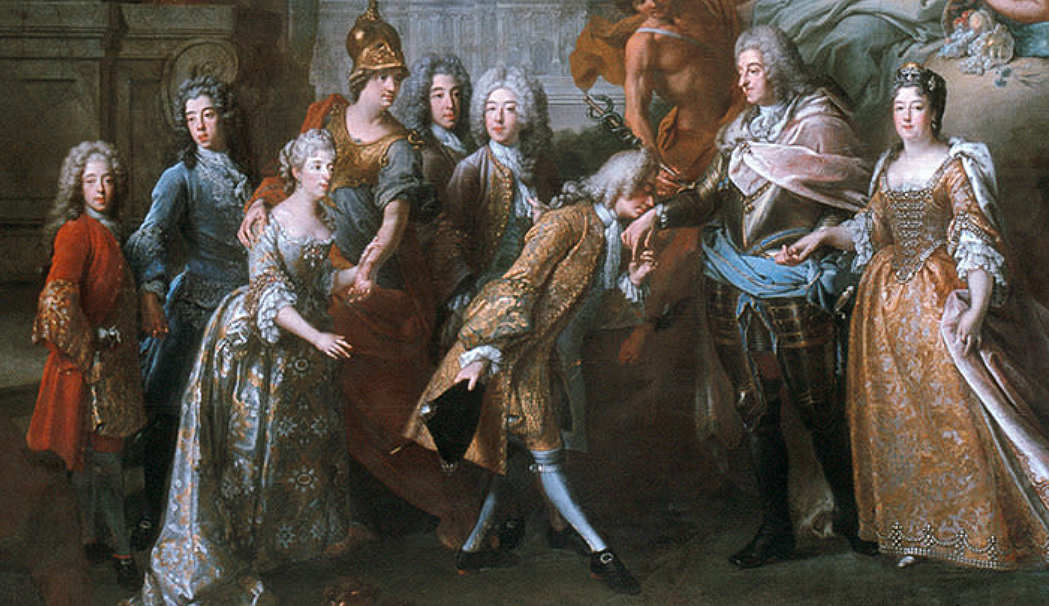
Allegory of Elector Max Emanuel being reunited with his family, by Joseph Vivien

On 8 April 1715, she finally reunited with her husband. She founded the Servitinnen monastery in Munich dedicated to Saint Elisabeth the same year. On the death of her husband in February 1726, she did not remarry but retired to Venice, where she died on 27 March 1730. She rests in the Theatine Church in Munich.

== Children ==
She was the mother of ten children by her husband, including Holy Roman Emperor Charles VII and Clemens August of Bavaria, Archbishop-Elector of Cologne, though only six of them survived to adulthood:

- A stillborn child (1695);
- Maria Anna Karoline (1696–1750), a nun;
- Charles VII, Holy Roman Emperor (1697–1745), King of Bohemia, and Elector of Bavaria;
- Philip Maurice Maria (1698–1719), posthumously elected Bishop of Paderborn and Bishop of Münster as news of his death had not yet spread;
- Ferdinand Maria Innocenz (1699–1738), Imperial Field Marshal;
- Clemens August (1700–1761), Archbishop of Cologne, Prince-Bishop of Hildesheim, Bishop of Paderborn;
- William (1701–1704), Prince of Bavaria, died in childhood;
- Alois John Adolf (1702–1705), Prince of Bavaria, died in childhood;
- John Theodore (1703–1763), Cardinal, Prince-Bishop of Regensburg, Bishop of Freising and Bishop of Liège;
- Maximilian Emanuel Thomas (1704–1709), Prince of Bavaria, died in childhood.

Preceded by Maria Antonia of Austria	Electress consort of Bavaria; 2 January 1695 – 26 February 1726	Succeeded by Maria Amalia, Holy Roman Empress
