= Clemens August of Bavaria =

Bavarian archbishop

- Archbishop of Cologne
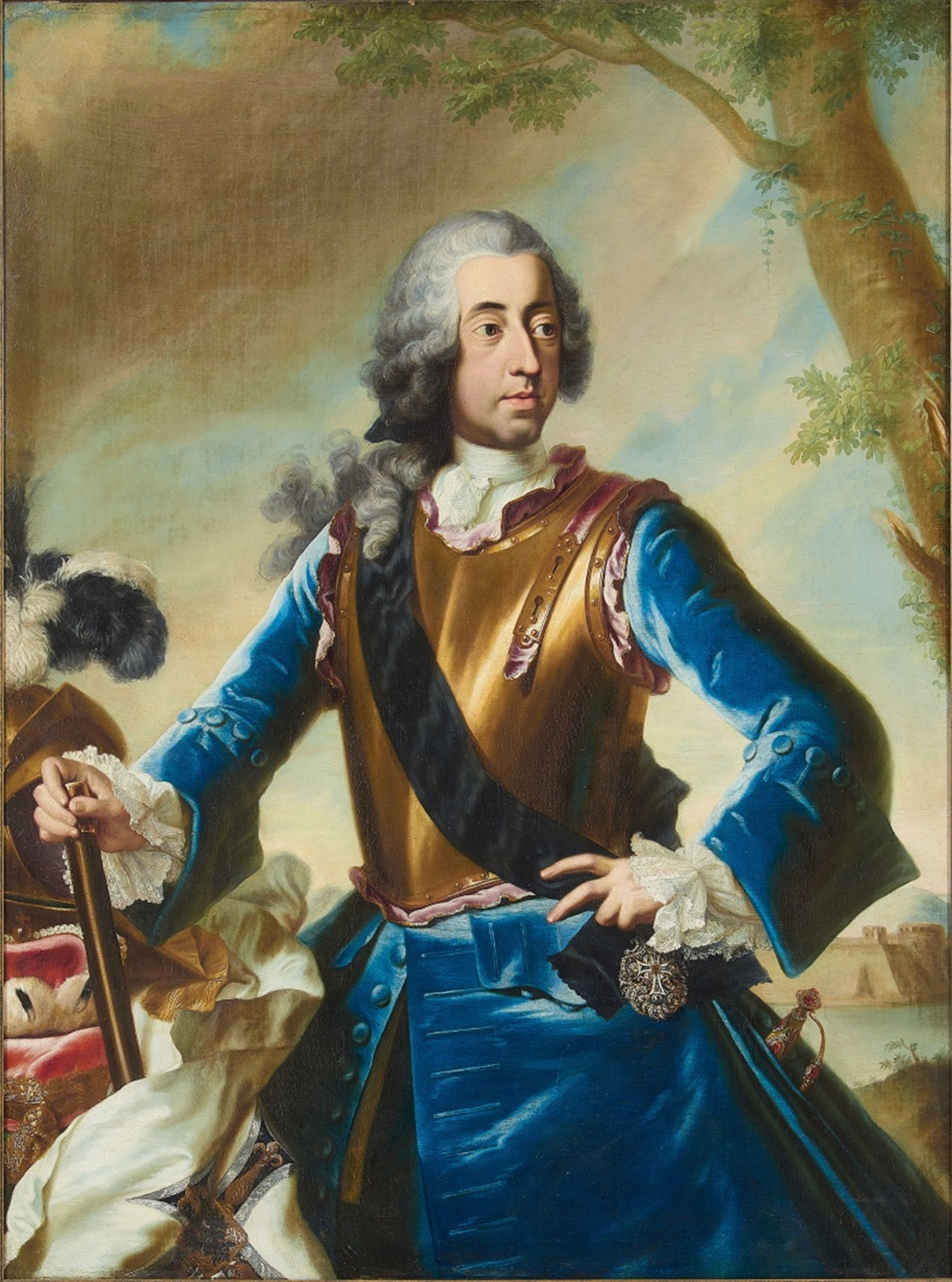
- Portrait by Georg Desmarées
- Church: Roman Catholic Church
- Archdiocese: Cologne
- See: Cologne
- Appointed: 1723
- Term ended: 1761
- Predecessor: Joseph Clemens of Bavaria
- Successor: Maximilian Frederick of Königsegg-Rothenfels

Orders
- Ordination: 4 March 1725
- Consecration: 9 November 1727 by Pope Benedict XIII

Personal details
- Born: 17 August 1700 Brussels, Spanish Netherlands
- Died: 6 February 1761 (aged 60) Schloss Philippsburg in Koblenz-Ehrenbreitstein

Clemens August of Bavaria (German: Clemens August von Bayern) (17 August 1700 – 6 February 1761) was an 18th-century member of the Wittelsbach dynasty of Bavaria and Archbishop-Elector of Cologne.

== Biography ==
Clemens August (Clementus Augustus) was born in Brussels, the son of Elector Maximilian II Emanuel of Bavaria and Theresa Kunegunda Sobieska and the grandson of King John III Sobieski of Poland. His family was split during the War of the Spanish Succession and was for many years under house arrest in Austria; only in 1715 did the family become re-united.

His uncle Joseph Clemens, Elector and Archbishop of Cologne, saw to it that Clemens August received several appointments in Altötting, the Diocese of Regensburg, and at the Prince-Provostry of Berchtesgaden, and he soon received papal confirmation as Bishop of Regensburg, and later of Cologne.

As Archbishop of Cologne, he was one of the Electors, a Prince-Bishop of Münster, Hildesheim, and Osnabrück, and a Grand Master of the Teutonic Order.

According to Jan Swafford, Clemens August did not owe his position of power to his "talent, intelligence or reason. In each of his exalted posts, Clemens August was splendidly brainless and incompetent, not in the least interested in governing anything. As Elector in Bonn, his attention would be given largely to pleasure in the form of ladies, music, dancing, and erecting monuments to his glory and munificence." (2014)

Clemens August, who mostly sided with the Austrian Habsburg-Lorraine side during the War of the Austrian Succession, personally crowned his brother Charles VII emperor at Frankfurt in 1742. After Charles's death in 1745, Clemens August then again leaned toward Austria. Over time, Clemens August changed more frequently the alliances, as of Allied of Austria or France, also under the influence of his frequently changing First Ministers and high donations.

He died in Schloss Philippsburg below the Festung Ehrenbreitstein in 1761. In March 1761, shortly after his death, Pope Clement XIII rejected the succession of Clemens August's brother Cardinal John Theodore of Bavaria as Archbishop and Prince-Elector of Cologne since the pope entertained some doubt on John Theodore's "moral conduct". This was the end of the reign of the Wittelsbach in Cologne after 178 years of continuous rule. In his will, Clemens August donated only to his successor as Elector and the court chamber of the Electorate of Cologne, but not the Elector of Bavaria. His nephew Maximilian III. Joseph then tried to challenge the will before the Supreme Court of Appeal, however, this failed on 23 January 1767.

== Cultural legacy ==
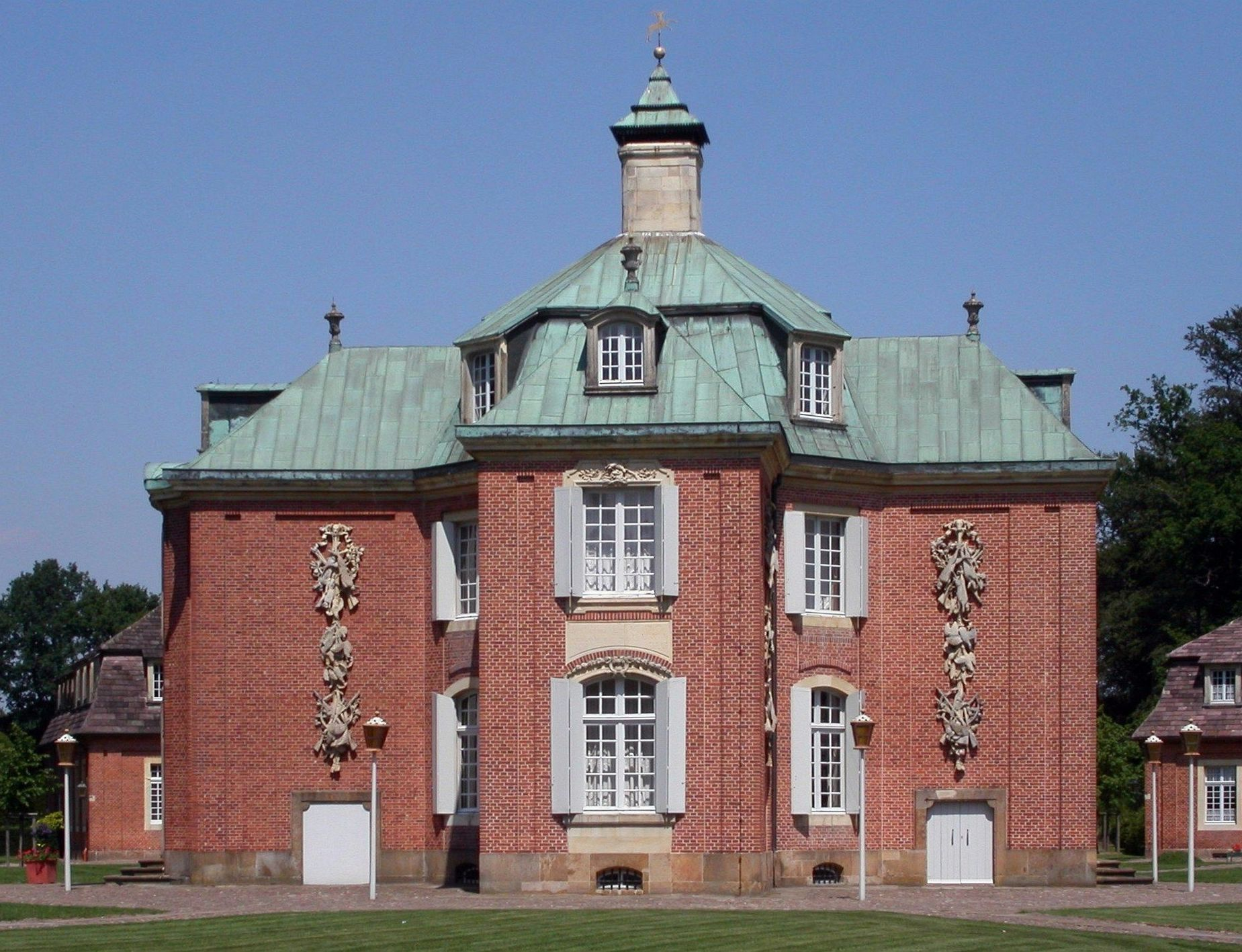
Clemenswerth Palace near Sögel built as a hunting lodge for Clemens August

Clemens August patronised the arts; among others he ordered to build the palaces of Augustusburg and Falkenlust in Brühl, North Rhine-Westphalia, listed on the UNESCO cultural world heritage list, and the church of St Michael in Berg am Laim in Munich. Other palaces like Schloss Arnsberg or Schloss Herzogsfreude have been lost.

Ludwig van Beethoven's Flemish grandfather became a musician in Bonn during the reign of Clemens August.

== Illegitimate children ==
Clemens August and his mistress Mechthild Brion had a daughter:

- Anna Marie zu Löwenfeld (1735– 26 November 1783) who married Franz Ludwig, Count of Holnstein (1723–1780), son of Clemens August's brother Charles VII, Holy Roman Emperor

== Ancestors ==
Ancestors of Clemens August of Bavaria

8. Maximilian I, Elector of Bavaria
4. Ferdinand Maria, Elector of Bavaria
9. Maria Anna of Austria
2. Maximilian II Emanuel, Elector of Bavaria
10. Victor Amadeus I, Duke of Savoy
5. Henriette Adelaide of Savoy
11. Christine Marie of France
1. Clemens August of Bavaria
12. Jakub Sobieski
6. John III Sobieski
13. Zofia Teofillia Daniłowicz
3. Teresa Kunegunda Sobieska
14. Henri Albert de La Grange d'Arquien
7. Marie Casimire Louise de la Grange d'Arquien
15. Françoise de la Châtre

== Bibliography ==
Alessandro Cont, La Chiesa dei principi. Le relazioni tra Reichskirche, dinastie sovrane tedesche e stati italiani (1688-1763), preface of Elisabeth Garms-Cornides, Trento, Provincia autonoma di Trento, 2018, pp. 57–92, https://www.academia.edu/38170694/La_Chiesa_dei_principi._Le_relazioni_tra_Reichskirche_dinastie_sovrane_tedesche_e_stati_italiani_1688-1763_prefazione_di_Elisabeth_Garms-Cornides_Trento_Provincia_autonoma_di_Trento_2018 Jan Swafford, 'Beethoven, anguish and triumph', Boston, 2014, p. 6

== See also ==
Clemens August of Bavaria House of Wittelsbach Born: 1700 Died: 1761
Catholic Church titles
Regnal titles
Preceded by Joseph Clemens of Bavaria	Prince-Bishop of Regensburg; 1716–19	Succeeded by John Theodore of Bavaria
Preceded by Franz Arnold von Wolff-Metternich zur Gracht	Prince-Bishop of Paderborn; 1719–61	Succeeded by William Anton of Asseburg
Preceded by Franz Arnold von Wolff-Metternich zur Gracht	Prince-Bishop of Münster; 1719–61	Succeeded by Maximilian Friedrich von Königsegg-Rothenfels
Preceded by Joseph Clemens of Bavaria	Prince-Archbishop of Cologne; 1723–61	Succeeded by Maximilian Friedrich von Königsegg-Rothenfels
Preceded by Joseph Clemens of Bavaria	Prince-Bishop of Hildesheim; 1723–61	Vacant Title next held by Frederick William of Westphalia
Preceded by Ernest Augustus, Duke of York and Albany as administrator	Prince-Bishop of Osnabrück; 1728–61	Vacant Title next held by Frederick, Duke of York and Albany as administrator
Preceded by Francis Louis of Palatinate-Neuburg	Grand Master of the Teutonic Order; 1732–1761	Vacant Title next held by Charles Alexander of Lorraine
