= Gods, Graves and Scholars =

Literary work by C. W. Ceram

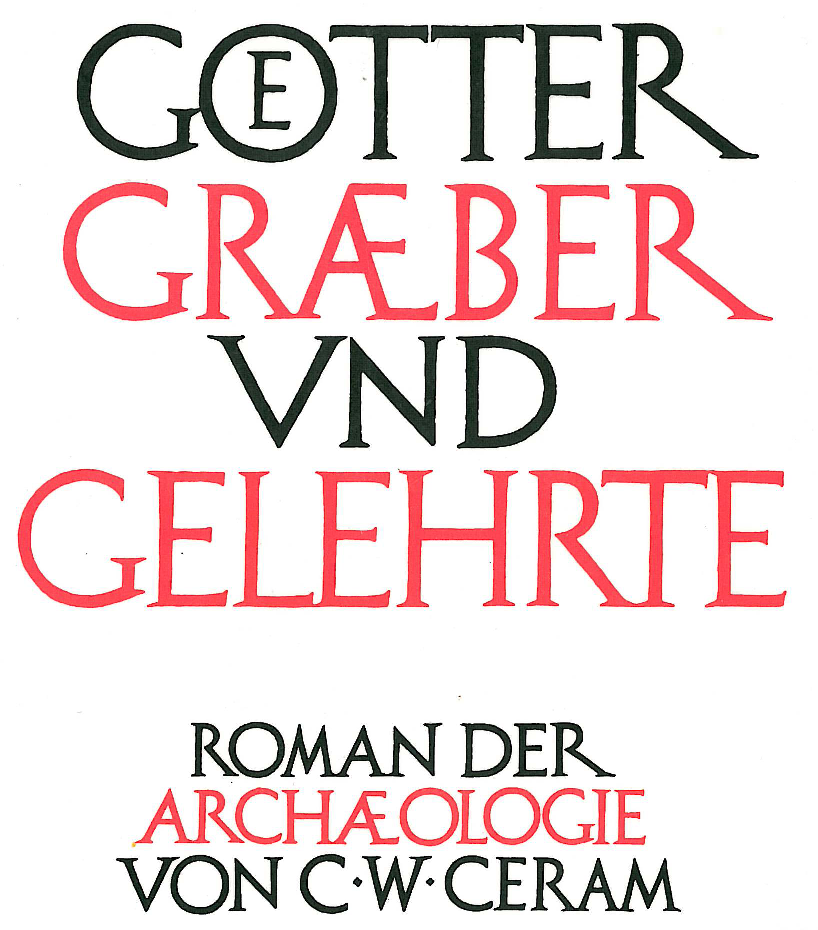
- Cover of a German edition of Gods, Graves, and Scholars.
- Author: C. W. Ceram
- Publication date: 1949

Gods, Graves, and Scholars is a book by German writer C. W. Ceram about the history of archaeology. First published in 1949, Ceram's book introduced the general reading public to the origin and development of archaeology. It sold extremely well — over five million copies have been published in 30 languages — and remains in print today.

The book covers Greek, Egyptian, Mesopotamian, as well as Mexican, Central American, and South American archaeology. It gives brief biographies of archaeologists like Heinrich Schliemann, Jean-François Champollion, Paul-Émile Botta, and Howard Carter, among others.

MGM bought the rights to the book for "protection purposes", as it contained a chapter titled "Robbers in the Valley of the Kings", which might have been seen as having influenced the film's script. They paid a reported $25,000.

The book inspired the German children' book author and humorist Hans Traxler to his "fairy-tale archaeological" parody The Truth About Hansel and Gretel, which was initially not recognized as a parody by numerous media and the public, and which depicts how the teacher Georg Ossegg allegedly archaeologically explores the witch's house of Hansel and Gretel.
