= Agnes Le Louchier =

Agnès Françoise (Agnes Franziska) Le Louchier
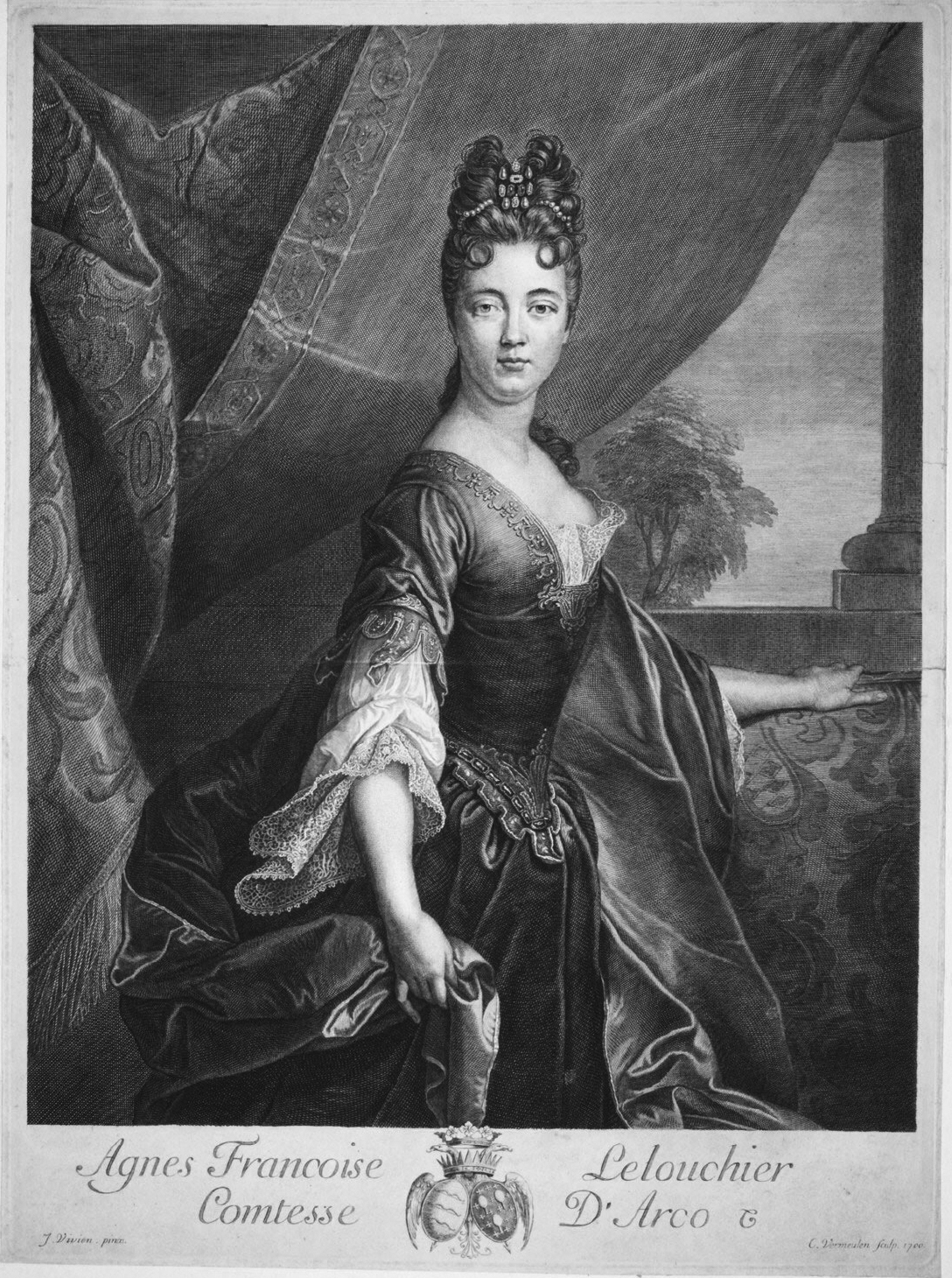
- Agnès-Françoise Le Louchier (Cornelis Martinus Vermeulen, 1700)
- Born: 1660
- Died: February 1717 (aged 56–57); Paris
- Spouse: Ferdinand von Arco
- Issue: With Maximilian II Emanuel: • Emanuel-François-Joseph of Bavaria
- Father: Jean François Le Louchier, Seigneur de Popuelles
- Mother: Charlotte d'Aubermont

Agnes-Françoise Le Louchier (1660-1717), was the royal mistress of Maximilian II Emanuel, Elector of Bavaria from 1694 until 1717. She also served as the spy of Bavaria at the French court.

== Early life ==
Agnès-Françoise Le Louchier was born in 1660 into the Flemish nobility. She was the daughter of Jean François Le Louchier, Lord of Popuelles and, his wife, Charlotte d'Aubermont.

== Personal life ==
She became the lover of Maximilian II Emanuel when he was the governor of the Spanish Netherlands. She accompanied him to Bavaria in 1694, when he married his second spouse, Theresa Kunegunda Sobieska, while she herself married the Bavarian officer Count Ferdinand von Arco. After the wedding, they returned to Brussels. She had a son with Maximilian, named Emanuel-François-Joseph (1695-1747), who was later legitimized by his father.

=== Work as a spy ===
In 1700, the Electress wished to separate from the Elector because of this affair but managed to reconcile. The same year, the Elector and Electress returned to Bavaria. Le Louchier was given an assignment as a spy by the Elector and sent to Paris to make use of political connections in favour of Bavarian interests. She succeeded with her task and was rewarded with a life pension. She lived with Maximilian during his exile from 1704 to 1715 until he met his wife again on 8 April 1715.
