= C. W. Ceram =

German journalist

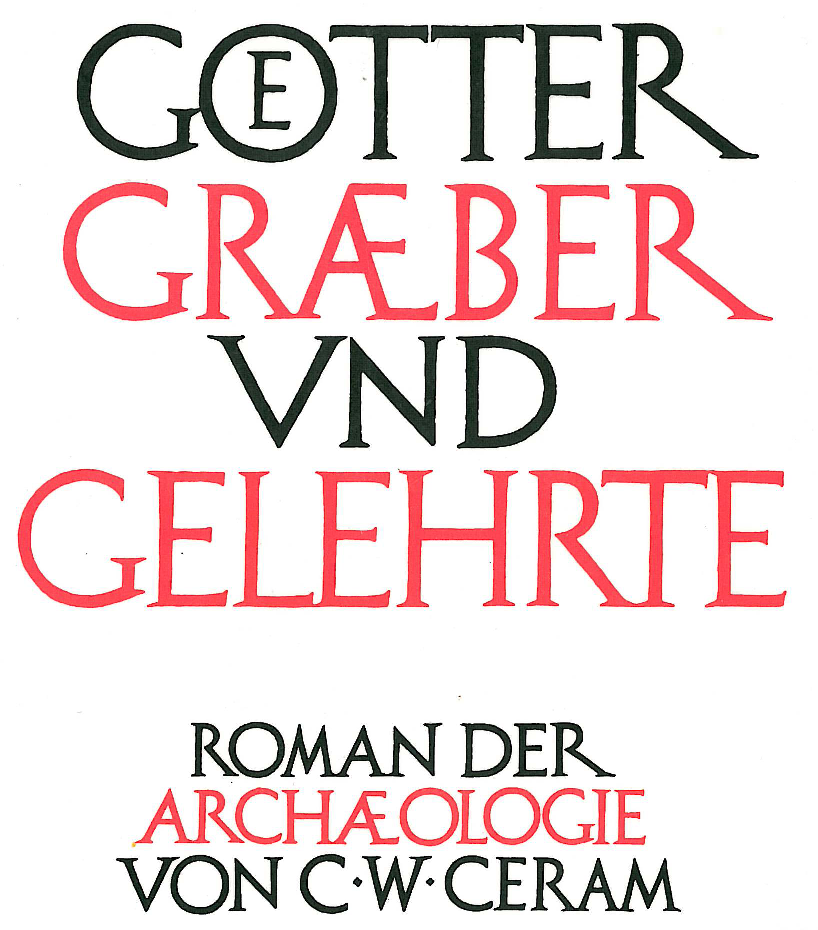
Original German cover of Gods, Graves and Scholars: The Story of Archaeology (1949)

Kurt Wilhelm Marek (20 January 1915 – 12 April 1972), best known by the pen name C. W. Ceram, was a German journalist, editor at Rowohlt Verlag, and author known for his popular works about archaeology. He chose to write using a pseudonym — spelling his own name backward as an ananym, and latinizing the K as C — to avoid association with his earlier work as a propagandist for the Third Reich.

Ceram was born in Berlin. During World War II, he was a member of the Propagandatruppe. His works from that period include Wir hielten Narvik, 1941, and Rote Spiegel - überall am Feind. Von den Kanonieren des Reichsmarschalls – Red Mirrors - Everywhere in Contact with the Enemy. About the Gunners of the Reichsmarschall, 1943.

In 1949, Ceram wrote his most famous book, Götter, Gräber und Gelehrte — published in English as Gods, Graves and Scholars: The Story of Archaeology — an account of the historical development of archaeology. Published in 28 languages, Ceram's book eventually received a printing of more than 5 million copies, and is still in print. His very first article of this type was about epigraphy entitled: On the Decipherment of an Unknown Script and was published in the Berliner Illustrierte (1935).

Other books by the author include The Secret of the Hittites (1956), March of Archaeology (1958) and The First American (1971), a book on ancient North American history. Using his actual name he published Yestermorrow: Notes on Man's Progress (1961); Hands on the Past: The Pioneer Archaeologists Tell Their Own Story (1966).

Kurt Marek was responsible for the publication of A Woman in Berlin, the anonymous memoir of a German woman raped by Red Army troops.

He died at Hamburg in 1972 at age 57.

The Ceram Prize in archaeology is named after him.
