= Maximilian II Emanuel =

Elector of Bavaria from 1679 to 1726

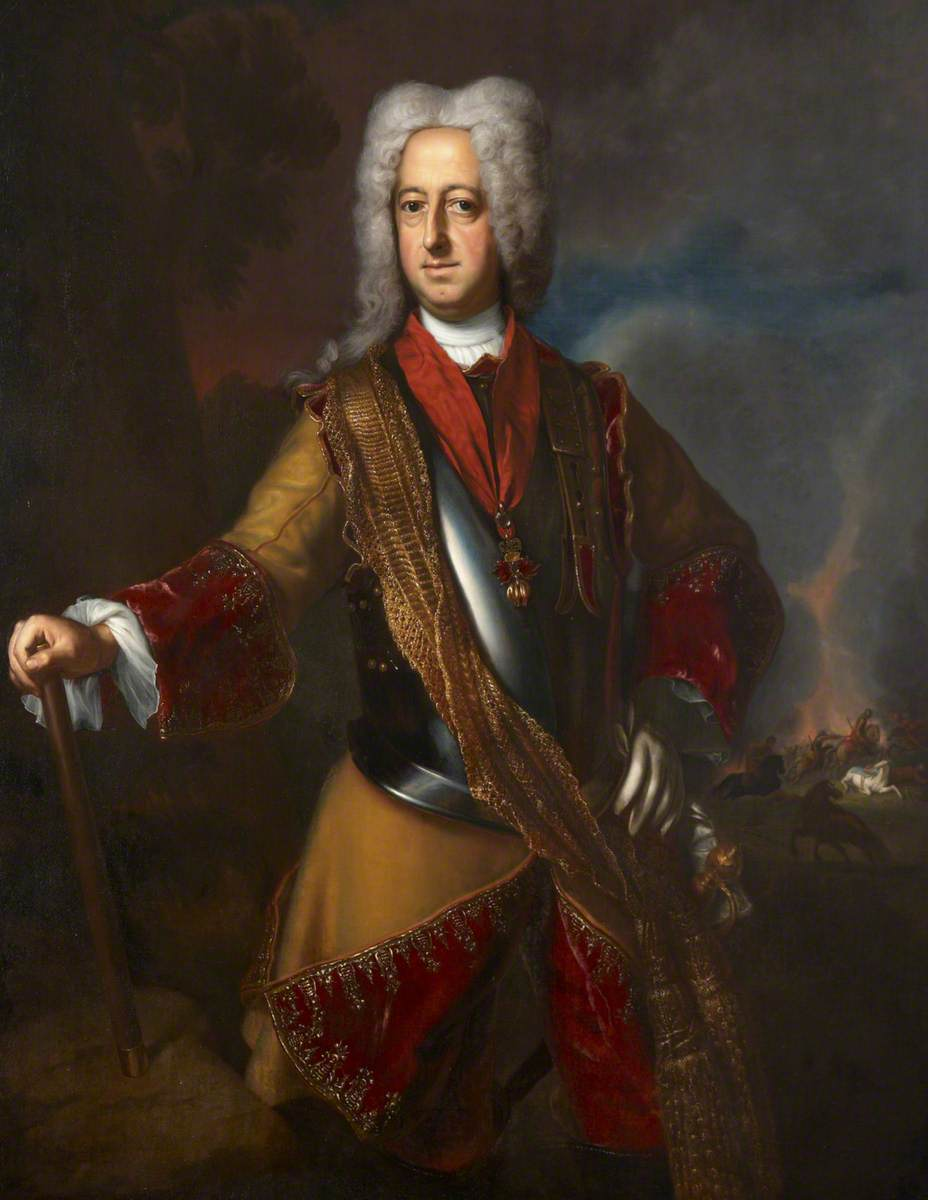
- Portrait by Andreas Møller, c. 1726

Elector of Bavaria
- Reign: 26 May 1679 – 26 February 1726
- Predecessor: Ferdinand Maria
- Successor: Charles Albert

Duke of Luxembourg
- In office 1712 – 11 April 1713
- Preceded by: Philip V
- Succeeded by: Charles V

29th Governor of the Spanish Netherlands
- In office 1691 – 7 March 1714
- Monarchs: Charles II; Philip V
- Preceded by: Francisco Antonio de Agurto
- Succeeded by: Prince Eugene of Savoy as governor of the Austrian Netherlands
- Born: 11 July 1662; Munich, Electorate of Bavaria, Holy Roman Empire
- Died: 26 February 1726 (aged 63); Munich, Electorate of Bavaria, Holy Roman Empire
- Burial: Theatine Church
- Spouses: Maria Antonia of Austria (m. 1685; died 1692) Theresa Kunegunda Sobieska (m. 1694)
- Issue Detail: Joseph Ferdinand; Charles VII, Holy Roman Emperor; Ferdinand Maria Innocenz; Clemens August; Johann Theodor
- House: Wittelsbach
- Father: Ferdinand Maria, Elector of Bavaria
- Mother: Henriette Adelaide of Savoy
- Religion: Roman Catholicism

Military service
- Battles/wars: Great Turkish War; Battle of Vienna; 1st Siege of Buda; Siege of Esztergom; 2nd Siege of Buda; Battle of Mohács; Siege of Belgrade; Nine Years' War; Battle of Landen; Siege of Namur; War of the Spanish Succession; First Battle of Höchstädt; Battle of Blenheim; Battle of Ramillies; Assault on Brussels

Maximilian II (11 July 1662 – 26 February 1726), also known as Max Emanuel or Maximilian Emanuel, was a Wittelsbach ruler of Bavaria and a prince-elector of the Holy Roman Empire. He was also the last governor of the Spanish Netherlands and Duke of Luxembourg. An able soldier, his ambition led to conflicts that limited his ultimate dynastic achievements.

He was born in Munich to Ferdinand Maria, Elector of Bavaria, and Princess Henriette Adelaide of Savoy.

== War against the Ottoman Empire ==
Maximilian inherited the elector's mantle while still a minor in 1679 and remained under his uncle Maximilian Philipp's regency until 1680. By 1683 he was already embarked on a military career, fighting in the defence of Vienna against the attempt of the Ottoman Empire to extend their possessions further into Europe. He returned to court for long enough to marry Maria Antonia, daughter of Leopold I, Holy Roman Emperor and Margaret Theresa of Spain, on 15 July 1685 in Vienna, Austria. This marriage was very unhappy since the couple disliked each other, but it was successful in producing the desired heir for both Bavaria and the Spanish monarchy. Maximilian Emanuel's fame was assured when, in 1688, he led the capture of Belgrade from the Turks, with the full support of Serbian insurgents under the command of Jovan Monasterlija.

== Governor of the Spanish Netherlands ==
In the War of the Grand Alliance he again fought on the Habsburgs' side, protecting the Rhine frontier, and, being the Emperor's son-in-law and the husband of the King of Spain's niece, was appointed governor of the Spanish Netherlands in late 1691.

His Netherlands adventure catalyzed Maximilian Emanuel's dynastic ambitions. One year after his appointment as governor, Maria Antonia died in Vienna, having given birth to a son, Joseph Ferdinand, who was appointed heir to the Spanish monarchy but died in 1699 before acceding the throne. An alternative avenue for Maximilian Emanuel's ambition was offered by his marriage on 12 January 1694 to Theresa Kunegunda Sobieska, the death of whose father, the elected King of Poland John III Sobieski, two years later, offered a potential avenue of influence in Polish affairs. Maximilian II was a candidate in the 1697 Polish–Lithuanian royal election, however, in view of the lack of strong support from other powers, the limited royal authority by the Sejm of the Polish–Lithuanian Commonwealth, and his greater interest in assuming the Spanish throne, he did not make a serious effort for the Polish crown.

However, he concentrated his interests in Western Europe, making his sons by Theresa Kunegunda Sobieska, Charles Albert and Clemens August, the principal beneficiaries of his ambitions.

The unsuccessful siege and bombardment of Brussels in 1695 during the Nine Years' War by French troops and the resulting fire during Max Emanuel's rule were together the most destructive event in the entire history of Brussels.

== War of the Spanish Succession ==
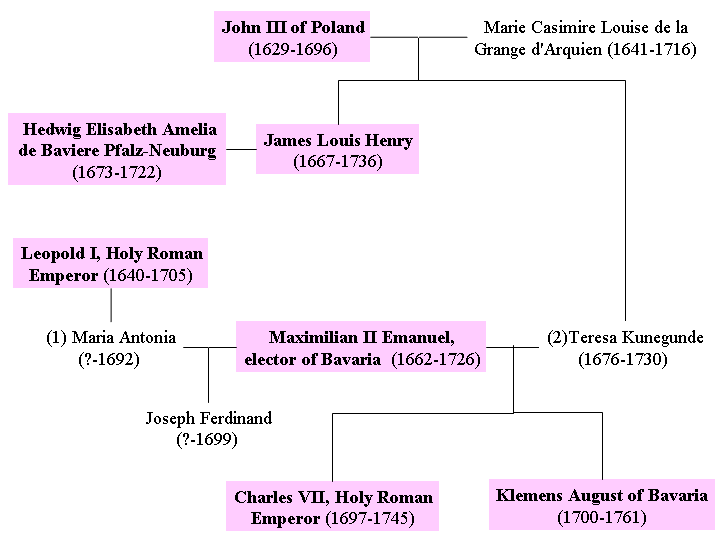
Family tree

Maximilian Emanuel, who had married Archduchess Maria Antonia, the sole child of Emperor Leopold's Spanish marriage, was one of the more serious claimants to the Spanish inheritance of Charles II of Spain, and the birth of his son Joseph Ferdinand in October 1692 immediately created a new claimant to the Spanish throne. In October 1698, William III of England and Louis XIV of France concluded the First Partition Treaty, which gave the Spanish crown with the Indies to Joseph Ferdinand, the Duchy of Milan to Emperor Leopold's younger son Archduke Charles, and the rest of Spanish Italy to France. The unexpected death of Joseph Ferdinand four months later voided this plan and in the Second Partition Treaty, the Bavarian portion of the inheritance was allotted to Archduke Charles. By the outbreak of the War of the Spanish Succession in 1701, Maximilian Emanuel, who had long-term imperial aspirations, had hoped that his governorship of the Spanish Netherlands might yet reap the reward of a share of the Spanish inheritance from either Leopold or, failing him, Louis XIV. Allying himself with the French against Austria, his campaign against Tyrol in 1703 did not have success and his plans were then frustrated by the disastrous defeat at the Battle of Blenheim in 1704.

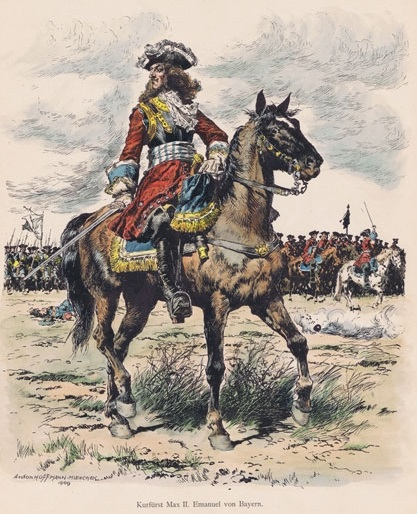
Max Emanuel as military commander

In 1704–05, following the evacuation of the Bavarian court to the Spanish Netherlands after the defeat at the Battle of Blenheim, Max Emanuel's consort apparently was in charge of the government in the Stewardship of Munich of the Electorate of Bavaria as Regent Princess. However, when Theresa Kunegunda had found love letters of the Countess of Arco, a mistress of Max Emanuel, she left Munich to see her mother in Venice. The army would not allow her to return. In the ensuing evacuation of his court to the Netherlands, Maximilian Emanuel's family became separated and his sons were held prisoners for several years in Austria, Clemens August being brought up by Jesuits. Bavaria was partitioned between Austria and Johann Wilhelm, Elector Palatine. The harsh Austrian administration which managed to extract massive amounts of money and manpower from Bavaria led to a serious peasant uprising within a year.

Coat of arms of Max Emanuel as ruler of Luxemburg and Namur

Maximilian Emanuel was again forced to flee the Netherlands after the Battle of Ramillies on 23 May 1706 and found refuge at the French court in Versailles where his late sister Maria Anna (1660–1690) had been the Dauphine of France. In 1712, Luxemburg and Namur were ceded to Maximilian Emanuel by his French allies, a cession that was not definitive since France was only the occupant of what was still the Spanish Netherlands. The war between France and Austria finally ended in 1714 in the Treaty of Rastatt in which Louis XIV compelled Austria to implement the full restoration of his faithful ally Maximilian Emanuel, including the return of the Upper Palatinate. Maximilian Emanuel was to remain in possession of Luxemburg, Namur and Charleroi until he was restored.

== Final years in Bavaria ==
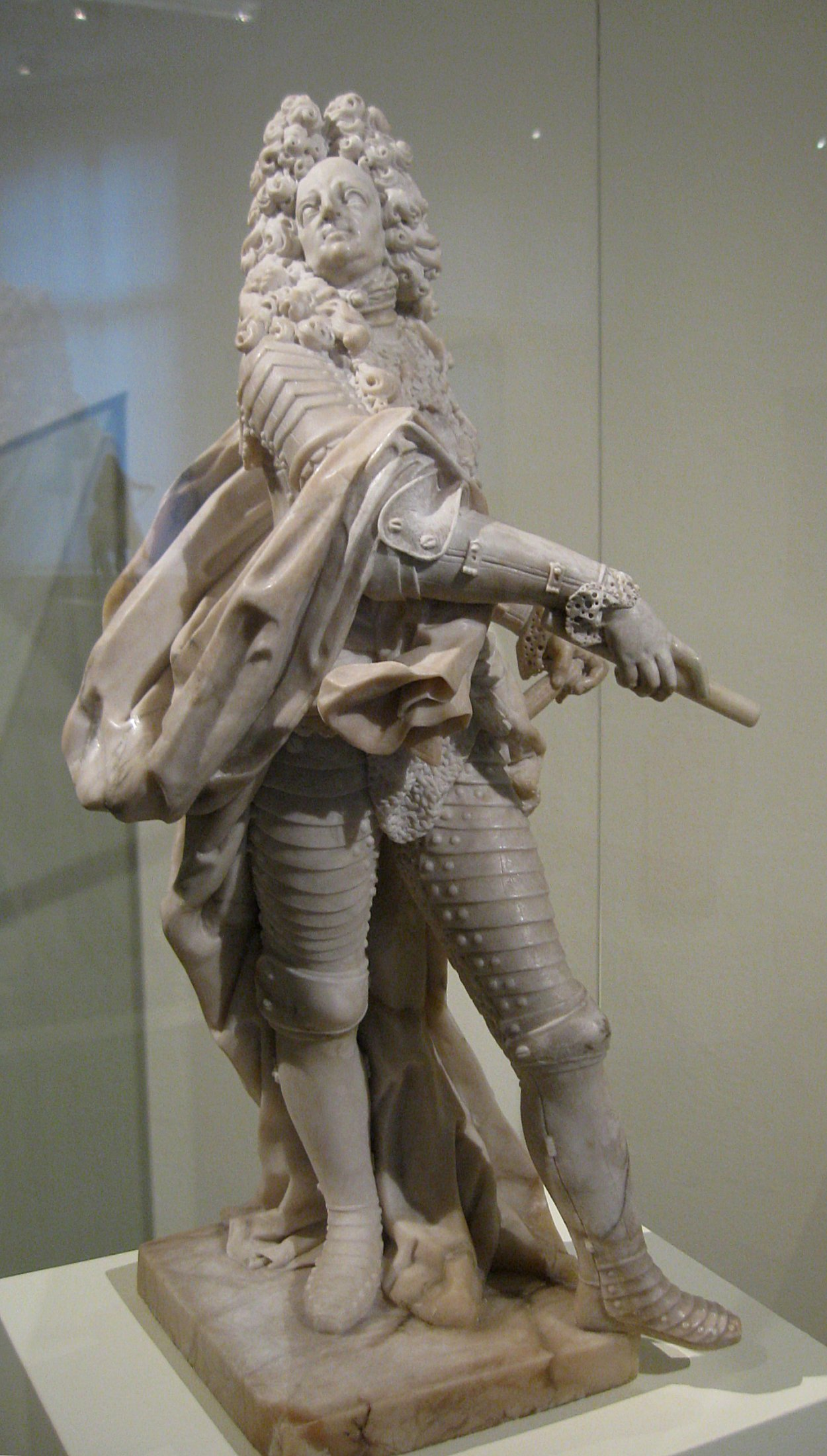
Max Emanuel by Giuseppe Volpini (1720)

Back in Bavaria, Maximilian Emanuel focused on architecture projects to balance the failure of his political ambitions. It was bitter for him to witness the royal elevation of the German princes Augustus II the Strong (1697), Frederick I of Prussia (1701) and George I of Hanover (1714) as well as of his cousin Victor Amadeus of Sicily (1713) while his own political dreams could not be realized.

Maximilian Emanuel then supported the Habsburgs in a new war against the Turks, contributing troops to the Army of the Holy Roman Empire in (1717).

In 1724, he created a union of all lines of the Wittelsbach dynasty to increase the influence of his house. The Wittelsbach prince-electors Max Emanuel, his son Clemens August of Cologne, Charles III Philip, Elector Palatine and Franz Ludwig of Trier had at that time four votes at their disposal for the next imperial election. The crown of the Holy Roman Empire was sought for either Max Emanuel or his son Charles Albert. Already in 1722 Charles Albert had been married to the Habsburg Archduchess Maria Amalia of Austria.

In 1726, Max Emanuel died of a stroke. He is buried in the crypt of the Theatinerkirche in Munich.

== Cultural legacy ==
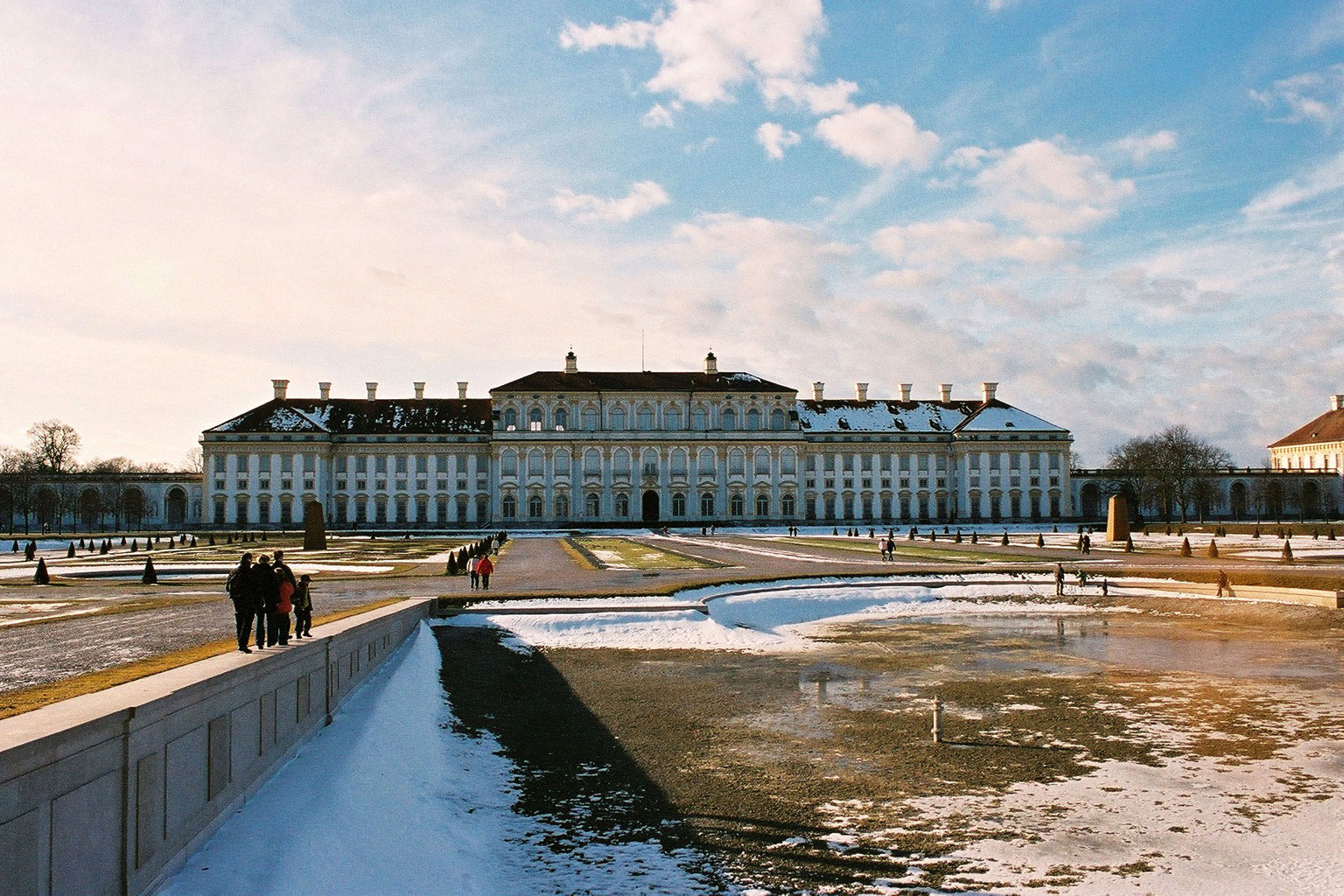
Schleissheim, New Palace.

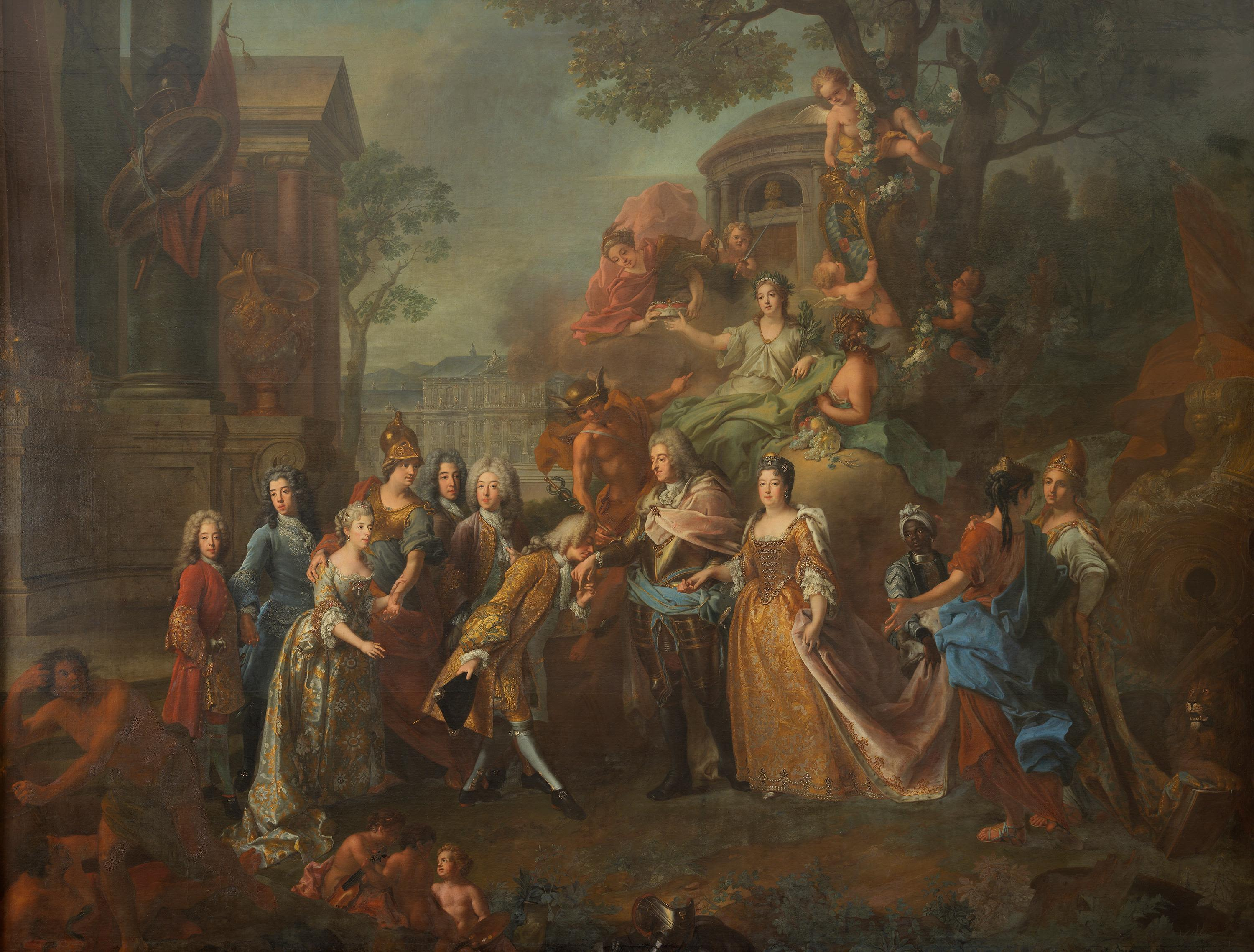
Family of Maximilian II Emanuel in 1733.

During his entire reign Maximilian II Emanuel patronized the arts. As governor of the Spanish Netherlands he acquired numerous Dutch and Flemish paintings for the Wittelsbach collection.

The first half of Max Emanuel's reign was still dominated by his parents' Italian court artists, like Enrico Zuccalli and Giovanni Antonio Viscardi. Between 1684 and 1688, Zuccalli built the Italian style Lustheim Palace for Max Emanuel and his first wife Maria Antonia, located on a central island. With the appointment of Joseph Effner serving as chief architect of the court and the young François de Cuvilliés as his assistant, the French influence significantly increased and Max Emanuel's return in 1715 marked the origin of the era of Bavarian Rococo.

The Nymphenburg Palace was enlarged, the Dachau Palace redesigned, and the new Schleissheim Palace was finally completed (1726) during Max Emanuel's reign. These palaces were connected with a network of canals as Max Emanuel had become acquainted with in the Netherlands. Between 1715 and 1717, he had the Baroque style Fürstenried Palace built by Effner as a hunting lodge which was the extension and modification of an already existing noble mansion.

== Marriages and issue ==
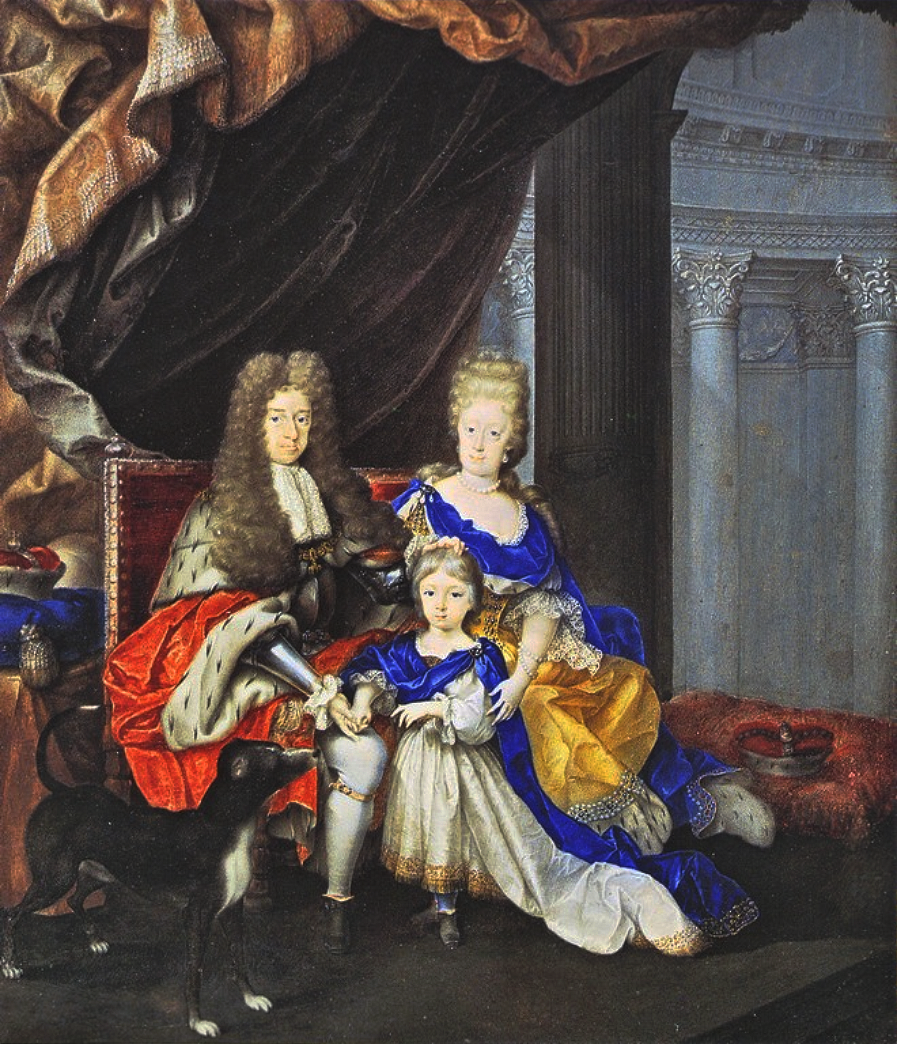
Max Emanuel with first wife Maria Antonia and their son Joseph Ferdinand by F. C. Bruni, 1695

First marriage with Maria Antonia of Austria, daughter of Emperor Leopold I, Holy Roman Emperor:

- Leopold Ferdinand (b. 22 May and d. 25 May 1689) died in infancy.
- Anton (b. and d. 19 November 1690) died at birth.
- Joseph Ferdinand (1692–1699)

Second marriage with Theresa Kunegunda Sobieska of Poland, daughter of King John III Sobieski:

- Stillborn child (1695)
- Maria Anna Karoline ( 4 August 1696 – 9 October 1750), since 1720 a nun, died unmarried and without issue.
- Charles Albert (1697–1745), elector of Bavaria, King of Bohemia and Holy Roman Emperor, ∞ 1722 Maria Amalia Josepha Anna of Austria (1701–1756)
- Philipp Moritz Maria (5 August 1698 – 12 March 1719), elected bishop of Paderborn and Münster, died unmarried and without issue.
- Ferdinand Maria (1699–1738), imperial general
- Clemens August (1700–1761), Grand Master of the Teutonic Order, Prince Archbishop of Cologne, Bishop of Regensburg, Paderborn, Osnabrück, Hildesheim and Münster
- Wilhelm (12 July 1701 – 12 February 1704) died in early childhood.
- Alois Johann Adolf (21 June 1702 – 18 June 1705) died in early childhood.
- Johann Theodor (1703–1763), Cardinal, Prince bishop of Regensburg, Freising and Liege
- Maximilian Emanuel Thomas (21 December 1704 – 18 February 1709) died in early childhood.

He had an illegitimate child with his French mistress Agnes Françoise Le Louchier;

- Emmanuel François Joseph, Count of Bavaria (1695– 2 July 1747) had two children with Maria Josepha Karolina von Hohenfels; also had an affair with Louise Anne de Bourbon, grand daughter of Madame de Montespan.

== Ancestry ==
Ancestors of Maximilian II Emanuel

8. William V, Duke of Bavaria
4. Maximilian I, Elector of Bavaria
9. Renata of Lorraine
2. Ferdinand Maria, Elector of Bavaria
10. Ferdinand II, Holy Roman Emperor
5. Maria Anna of Austria
11. Maria Anna of Bavaria
1. Maximilian II Emanuel, Elector of Bavaria
12. Charles Emmanuel I, Duke of Savoy
6. Victor Amadeus I, Duke of Savoy
13. Catherine Michaela of Spain
3. Henriette Adelaide of Savoy
14. Henry IV of France
7. Christine of France
15. Marie de' Medici

== Sources ==
- Spencer, Charles (2005). Blenheim: Battle for Europe. Phoenix. ISBN 0-304-36704-4.
- Storrs, Christopher (1999). War, Diplomacy and the Rise of Savoy 1690–1720. Cambridge University Press. ISBN 0521551463.
- Ludwig Hüttl: Max Emanuel. Der Blaue Kurfürst 1679–1726. Eine politische Biographie. Munich: Süddeutscher Verlag, 1976. ISBN 3-7991-5863-4 (in German)
- Christian Probst: Lieber bayrisch sterben. Der bayrische Volksaufstand der Jahre 1705 und 1706. Munich: Süddeutscher Verlag, 1978. ISBN 3-7991-5970-3 (in German)
- Marcus Junkelmann: Kurfürst Max Emanuel von Bayern als Feldherr. Munich: Herbert Utz Verlag, 2000. ISBN 3-89675-731-8 (in German)

Maximilian II Emanuel House of Wittelsbach Born: 11 July 1662 Died: 26 February 1726
Regnal titles
Preceded by Ferdinand Maria	Elector of Bavaria; 1679–1726	Succeeded by Charles Albert
Preceded by Philip V & VII	Duke of Luxembourg; Marquis of Namur; 1712–1713	Succeeded by Charles V & IV
Political offices
Preceded by Francisco Antonio de Agurto, Marquis of Castañaga	Governor of the Spanish Netherlands; 1692–1706	Vacant British and Dutch military occupation Title next held by Prince Eugene of Savoy as governor of the Austrian Netherlands
