= Secret Treaty of Dover =

1670 treaty between England and France

Treaty of Dover
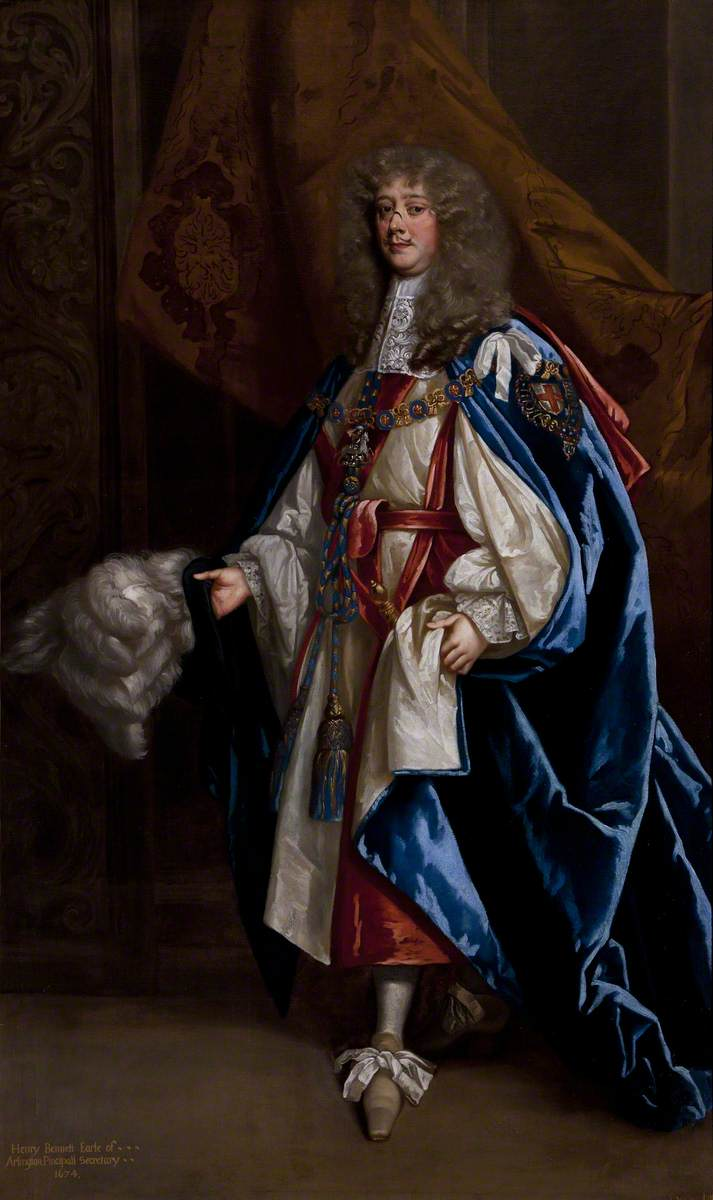
- Henry Bennet, 1st Earl of Arlington, who led negotiations on behalf of Charles II of England
- Signed: 1 June 1670
- Location: Dover, England
- Negotiators: France Marquis de Croissy; England Earl of Arlington
- Original signatories: (Kingdom of France) Louis XIV of France; (Kingdom of England) Charles II of England
- Parties: France; England
- Languages: French

The Treaty of Dover, also known as the Secret Treaty of Dover, was an agreement between Louis XIV of France and Charles II of England signed at Dover on 1 June 1670. Officially, it only committed England to provide France with general diplomatic assistance. However, of greater significance were secret provisions which remained largely unknown until published by historians over a century later.

Under these, Charles would provide military backing for a French invasion of the Dutch Republic, and committed to convert to Catholicism at some future date. In return, Louis agreed to pay him a secret pension of £230,000 per year, as well as a bonus when his conversion was made public. Charles hoped these payments would help make him financially independent of Parliament.

Although the conversion clause was never activated, the treaty led to the Third Anglo-Dutch War, which lasted from 1672 until 1674 and was a related conflict of the 1672 to 1678 Franco-Dutch War.

== Background ==
A possible Anglo-French treaty had been discussed after the 1660 Stuart Restoration, but none was agreed. Despite growing tensions over French ambitions in the Spanish Netherlands, Louis XIV decided an agreement with the Dutch Republic might allow him to achieve these without war. A Franco-Dutch defensive treaty was signed in 1662, while in January 1666 France entered the Second Anglo-Dutch War against England.

France took a minor role in the war, as mutual suspicion grew between the Dutch and Louis. Following the peace Treaty of Breda (1667), Louis invaded the Spanish Netherlands later that year, beginning the War of Devolution. To oppose French expansion in the region, a Triple Alliance was formed between the Dutch Republic, England and Sweden during 1668, which immediately pressured Louis into signing a peace treaty with Spain. During 1669, friction among the members of the Triple Alliance convinced Louis that he could induce either England or the Dutch Republic to leave it. Following an unsuccessful attempt to negotiate with the Dutch, Louis was approached by Charles with the offer of an alliance, which was delivered secretly by Charles' sister. At this stage, the only participants in the talks were Louis XIV of France, Charles II of England, and Charles's sister Henrietta, duchesse d'Orléans. Louis was first cousin to Charles (through their grandfather Henry IV of France); Henrietta was also Louis's sister-in-law through her marriage to his only brother, Phillippe, duc d'Orléans.

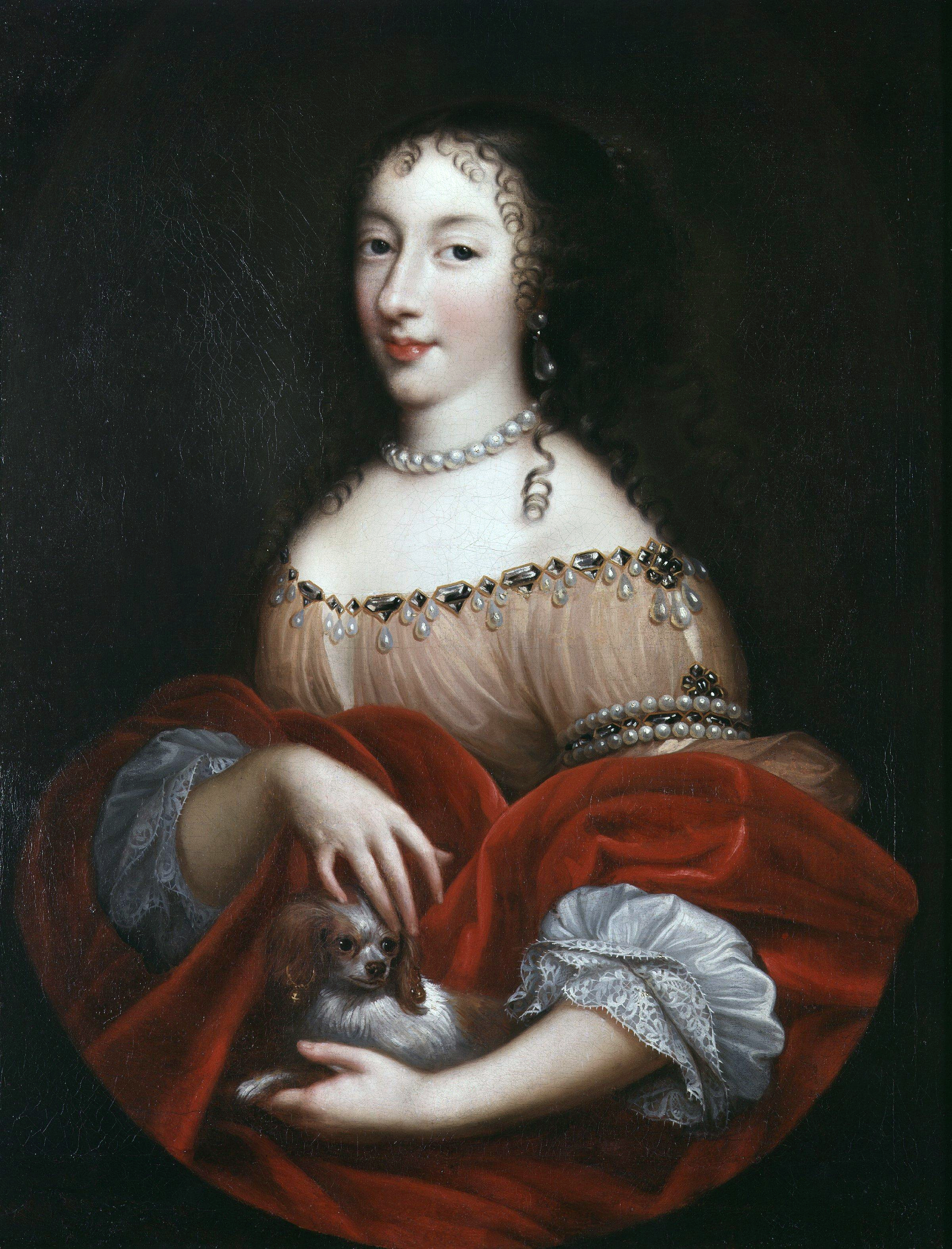
Henrietta of England, sister of Charles II of England and sister-in-law of Louis XIV of France, who helped negotiate the secret terms.

Charles's motives for secretly entering into negotiations with France, while England was still part of the Triple Alliance against France, have been debated among historians. Suggested motives include: a desire to gain the alliance of Europe's strongest state; to ensure Charles' political and financial independence from the English parliament; to put England in a position to receive a share of the Spanish Empire if it broke up (the infant Carlos II had no clear heir); to gain the support of English Catholics (and possibly also Protestant dissenters) for the monarchy; or to seek revenge on the Dutch for the English defeat in the Second Anglo-Dutch War, particularly the humiliating Raid on the Medway. Charles initially attempted to form an alliance with France in 1668, without abandoning the Triple Alliance, so was not as consistent as Louis in opposing the Dutch. Louis was married to Maria Theresa, the eldest daughter of Philip IV of Spain (died 1665); Maria Theresa had renounced her inheritance rights, but Louis consistently manoeuvred to acquire Spanish territory adjacent to France and to promote his wife's potential claim to the Spanish throne. Louis rebuffed Charles's approach in 1668, as Charles was not willing to join a French attack on Spain.

In the early part of 1669, Louis attempted to gain Dutch agreement to his acquiring all or most of the Spanish Netherlands, but the Dutch themselves were anxious to prevent a French army being stationed on or near their frontiers. During the same period, Charles attempted to preserve the Triple Alliance by settling outstanding overseas trade issues with the Dutch, with little success. Through his ambassador Lord St Albans, Charles attempted simultaneously to restart negotiations for a French alliance, but Louis repeated the condition that England must join him in attacking the Netherlands. Charles remained unenthusiastic, but his failure to gain the security he sought by other diplomatic means forced him to accept this precondition, subject to substantial French financial assistance. The parties entered into more detailed discussions by December 1669. During the five months in which detailed terms were being agreed, both parties attempted to reach understandings with Spain: their realisation that Spain might cede the Spanish Netherlands to France in a territorial exchange or act in concert with the Triple Alliance was a strong incentive for Charles and Louis respectively to reach a final agreement.

By the secret treaty, Charles was to abandon the Triple Alliance with Sweden and the Dutch Republic in favour of assisting Louis in conquering the Dutch Republic. Provided that the conquest was successfully completed, England was promised several very profitable ports along one of the major rivers that run through the Dutch Republic. The main components of the treaty can be paraphrased:

The King of England will make a public profession of the Catholic faith, and will receive the sum of two millions of crowns, to aid him in this project, from the Most Christian King, in the course of the next six months. The date of this declaration is left absolutely to his own pleasure. The King of France will faithfully observe the Treaty of Aix-la-Chapelle, as regards Spain, and the King of England will maintain the Treaty of the Triple Alliance in a similar manner. If new rights to the Spanish monarchy revert to the King of France, the King of England will aid him in maintaining these rights. The two Kings will declare war against the United Provinces. The King of France will attack them by land, and will receive the help of 6000 men from England. The King of England will send 50 men-of-war to sea, and the King of France 30; the combined fleets will be under the Duke of York's command. His Britannic Majesty will be content to receive Walcheren, the mouth of the Scheldt, and the isle of Cadzand, as his share of the conquered provinces. Separate articles will provide for the interests of the Prince of Orange. The Treaty of Commerce, which has already begun, shall be concluded as promptly as possible.

By Article 7 of the treaty, Charles was able to secure only a vague promise that the rights and interests of his nephew, William, Prince of Orange, would be respected.

The secret treaty did not become public until 1771 when the historian Sir John Dalrymple published its contents in his Memoirs of Great Britain and Ireland. Had it been published in Charles II's lifetime, the results might have been drastic; considering the enormous effect of Titus Oates's highly unreliable assertions of a Popish Plot, an even greater backlash might have followed had the English public learned that the King actually obliged himself to turn Catholic and that he was willing to rely on French troops to impose that conversion on his own subjects.

== The "cover" treaty ==
The secret treaty was signed and sealed in June 1670. The Duke of Buckingham was then appointed to negotiate a treaty with the King of France. He was amazed by how smoothly it went. This treaty closely followed the secret treaty just concluded, but the clause by which King Charles was to declare himself a Roman Catholic as soon as the affairs of his kingdom permitted did not appear; neither, therefore, did the stipulation that the attack on the Netherlands would follow his declaration. This treaty was signed by all five members of the Cabal Ministry on 21 December 1670 and was made known to the public. However King Charles and the French knew it was a meaningless fake.

== Consequences ==
Military preparations took some time; Louis declared war on the Dutch on 6 April 1672, and Charles followed suit the next day. On 14 April 1672 under the Treaty of Stockholm, France paid Sweden subsidies to remain neutral, while also promising Sweden military support if it were threatened by Brandenburg-Prussia. This Franco-Swedish alliance completed Louis' diplomatic encirclement of the Republic.

The Third Anglo-Dutch War started badly for the Dutch. The French strategy was to invade the Dutch Republic along the line of the River Rhine where Dutch defences were weakest, outflanking the main defences on the Dutch border with the Spanish Netherlands. Despite warnings about French intentions, the Dutch leader Johan de Witt mistakenly thought that the war against France and England would be decided at sea, and he prioritised equipping the Dutch fleet while neglecting the eastern frontier fortresses. This led to significant early French successes and a near-collapse of the Dutch army, which was forced to retreat behind the inundations of The Dutch Water Line and offer peace terms that were very favourable to France. The year 1672 is known to the Dutch as the Rampjaar or 'Year of disaster': the Orangists blamed de Witt whom they forced to resign, and they later brutally killed him and his brother Cornelis.

The breathing space afforded by its retreat behind the inundations, followed by military reforms, recruitment of new troops and unofficial Spanish assistance, enabled the Dutch army, led by William III of Orange as its Captain-General, to hold the Dutch Water Line for the rest of 1672 and 1673. Louis was now involved in a war of attrition and faced growing opposition from other European powers. Charles was short of money, as the costs of deploying the English fleet were much greater than expected despite French subsidies, and he faced increasing domestic opposition to the war. Part of this opposition related to English perceptions that the French fleet had stood by while the English fleet bore the brunt of the fighting the Dutch.

In the Battle of Solebay in 1672, d'Estrées, commanding the French squadron, avoided the main battle and only engaged a much smaller Dutch force at long-range, earning the condemnation of English, and of some French officers. The conduct of the French fleet in the two 1673 Battles of the Schooneveld was undistinguished and, in the final 1673 conflict, the Battle of the Texel, D'Estrées, either through poor seamanship, or because he had been ordered by Louis XIV to preserve the French fleet should England make peace with the Dutch, failed to engage the Dutch closely. In addition, Dutch privateers had been much more successful at capturing English merchant ships than English privateers attacking Dutch vessels in this war.

Desperate for funds, Charles was forced to call Parliament into session for the first time in over two years. He had hoped to keep it prorogued in order to wage the war without its oversight. In 1674, largely because of the pressure put upon Charles by Parliament, England signed the Treaty of Westminster: this largely restored the pre-war status quo and ended the Third Anglo-Dutch War. The French would continue to fight for four more years. A peace conference was convened at Nijmegen in 1676, but this made little progress as the French insisted in retaining the Dutch fortress of Maastricht. However, the conclusion of an Anglo-Dutch defensive treaty in March 1678 convinced Louis to offer peace without the cession of any Dutch territory, leading to the signing of the Treaty of Nijmegen. Although not unfavourable to the Dutch, and less favourable to France than the terms offered by the Dutch in 1672, France gained Franche-Comté and several towns in the Spanish Netherlands by this treaty, although relinquishing other conquests. More importantly, Louis achieved a diplomatic victory by breaking the European alliance against him.

In 1672, Charles issued a Declaration of Indulgence which suspended the penal laws against nonconforming Protestants and also relaxed (but did not suspend) the penal laws applying to Roman Catholics. When Parliament reconvened that year, they denounced the Declaration and announced that the English monarch did not possess the power to issue proclamations that suspended penal laws passed by the Parliament. Furthermore, they refused to fund the ongoing Third Anglo-Dutch War until the declaration was withdrawn. Charles was forced to comply with Parliament's demands, thereby ending the chance offered by the treaty of reconciling England with the Roman Catholic Church.

The treaty's reference to the possibility of "new rights to the Spanish monarchy reverting to the King of France" envisaged the possibility of Charles II of Spain dying childless, and of Louis then claiming the Spanish throne for the House of Bourbon through his wife. At the time of the treaty, the Spanish monarch was only nine years old, but his infirmity was already evident and well-known, casting doubt on his ever being able to beget children. However, Charles's promise to Louis was purely personal, and as the Spanish King outlived him, his promise had no effect. When, shortly after the conclusion of the Nine Years' War, the death of Charles II of Spain seemed imminent, the exhausted participants agreed by the First Partition Treaty of 1698, brokered by William III, that Joseph Ferdinand of Bavaria would succeed to the Spanish throne, and that France and Austria would divide Spain's European possessions outside the Iberian Peninsula. After Joseph Ferdinand's death in 1699, the Second Partition Treaty of 1700, also sponsored by William III awarded Spain and its overseas possessions to Archduke Charles and most of Spain's European possessions to France. However, when the Spanish king died childless in 1700, William III's foreign policy initiative was nullified when Louis claimed the whole Spanish inheritance for his grandson, and French ambitions caused the War of Spanish Succession.

== See also ==
- List of treaties

== Bibliography ==
- Ady, Julia (1894). Madame, a Life of Henrietta, Daughter of Charles I and Duchess of Orleans. Seeley & Co.
- Black, Jeremy. "British Foreign Policy and International Affairs during Sir William Trumbull's Career." The British Library Journal 19.2 (1993): 199–217.
- Boxer, C. R. (1969). "Some Second Thoughts on the Third Anglo-Dutch War, 1672–1674". Trans. R. Hist. Soc. 19: 67–94. doi:10.2307/3678740. JSTOR 3678740. S2CID 159934682.
- Browning, Andrew, ed. English historical documents: 1660–1714 (Eyre & Spottiswoode, 1953), pp 863–867 for text.
- Bryant, Arthur. King Charles II (1955), pp. 154–168.
- Carsten, F. L. (1961). The New Cambridge Modern History: Volume 5, The Ascendancy of France, 1648–88. Cambridge University Press. ISBN 978-0521045445.
- Coote, Stephen (2000). Royal Survivor: The Life of Charles II. St. Martin's Press. ISBN 0-312-22687-X.
- Feiling, Keith. British Foreign Policy 1660–1672 (1930). excerpt 1968 reprint
- Frost, Robert (2000). The Northern Wars; State and Society in Northeastern Europe 1558–1721. Routledge. ISBN 978-0582064294.
- Howat, G. M. D. Stuart and Cromwellian Foreign Policy (1974) pp 95–138.
- Hutton, Ronald (1986). "The Making of the Secret Treaty of Dover, 1668–1670". The Historical Journal. 29 (2): 297–318. doi:10.1017/S0018246X00018756. S2CID 159787254.
- Ingrao, C. W. (2000). The Hapsburg Monarchy, 1618–1815. Cambridge University Press. ISBN 978-0521785051.
- Jenkins, E. H. (1973). A History of the French Navy. MacDonald and Jane's. ISBN 978-0786457847.
- Jones, J. R (2013). The Anglo-Dutch Wars of the Seventeenth Century. Routledge. ISBN 978-1315845975.
- Jones, J. R. Country and Court (1978), pp 64–73.
- Lodge, Richard. "English Foreign Policy, 1660–1715" History 15#60 (1931) pp 296–307.
- Maurice, D. Lee Jr (1961). "The Earl of Arlington and the Treaty of Dover". Journal of British Studies. 1 (1): 58–70. doi:10.1086/385435. JSTOR 175099. S2CID 159658912.
- Miller, John. Popery and politics in England (Cambridge UP, 1973), pp. 108–114.
- Ogg, David. England in the Reign of Charles II (2nd ed. 2 vol 1936)
- Rommelse, Gijs (2006). The Second Anglo-Dutch War (1665–1667): Raison D'état, Mercantilism and Maritime Strife. Verloren. ISBN 9789065509079.
