= Treaty of London (1700) =

1700 treaty between France, Britain, and Dutch Republic

Second Treaty of Partition between England, (Note: Until 1707, England and Scotland were separate countries under one monarch, but treaties were signed by William as "King of Great Britain".) France and the Dutch Republic (Note: Full original title The treaty betwixt the Most Christian King (ie France), the King of Great Britain, and the States General of the United Provinces for settling the succession of the crown of Spain and the dominions thereunto belonging in case his Catholick Majesty (Charles II of Spain) die without issue.)
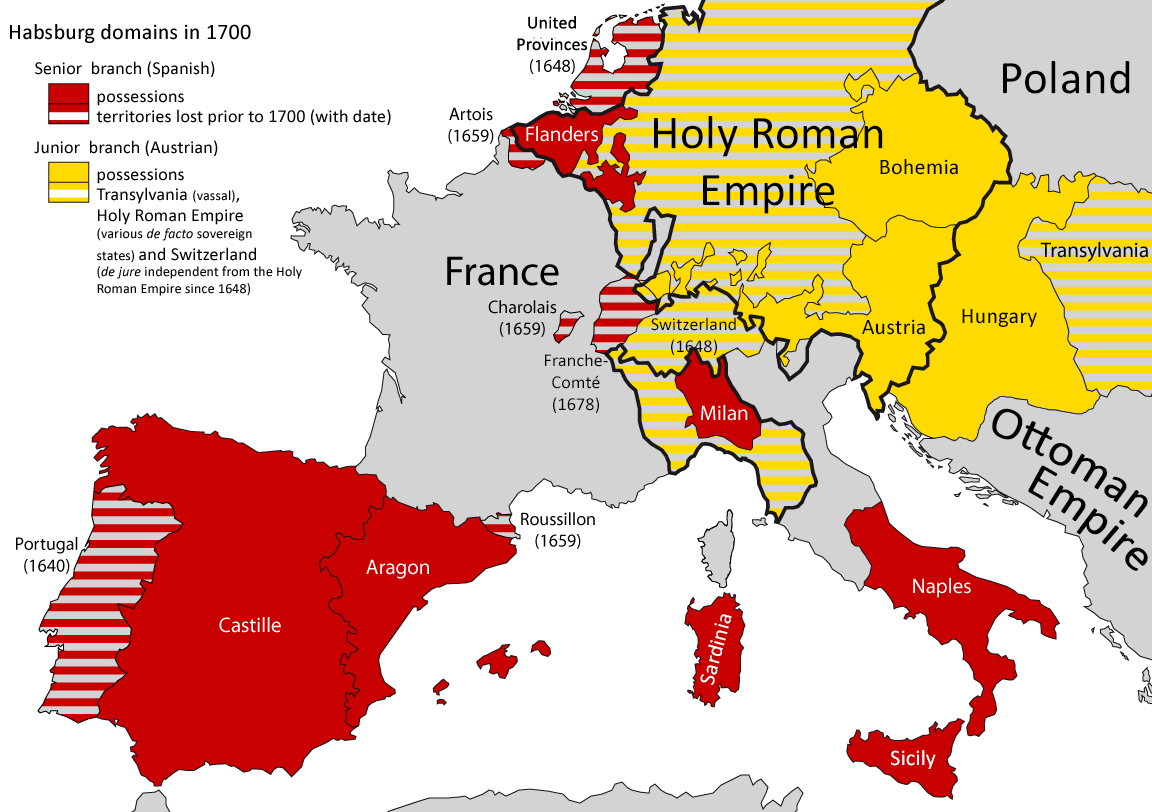
- Spanish (red) and Austrian (yellow) European possessions 1700
- Context: Voiding of Treaty of The Hague (1698) due to the death of Joseph Ferdinand in February 1699
- Signed: 24 March 1700
- Location: London and The Hague
- Parties: France; Dutch Republic; England

The Treaty of London (1700) (Dutch: Verdrag van Londen, French: Traités de Londres) or Second Partition Treaty was the second attempt by Louis XIV of France and William III of England to impose a diplomatic solution to the issues that led to the 1701-1714 War of the Spanish Succession. Both divided the Spanish Empire without prior consultation and since the Spanish viewed an undivided Empire as non-negotiable, historians generally view them as largely unenforceable.

Charles II of Spain became the last ruler of Habsburg Spain at the age of five in 1665. He suffered from ill health most of his life and despite marrying twice, by 1698 it was clear he would die without children, leaving the question of his successor unresolved. Although no longer the leading European power, the Empire remained a strong global presence and as the closest heirs were from the Austrian Habsburg and French Bourbon families, acquisition by either would significantly impact the European balance of power.

Hoping to avoid another costly conflict like the Nine Years' War, in 1698 William and Louis agreed to the Treaty of The Hague (1698), or First Partition Treaty, making Joseph Ferdinand heir to the Spanish throne. It became void when he died of smallpox in February 1699, and the Treaty of London replaced him with Archduke Charles, younger son of Emperor Leopold I. It ultimately failed to prevent the outbreak of war in July 1701.

== Background ==
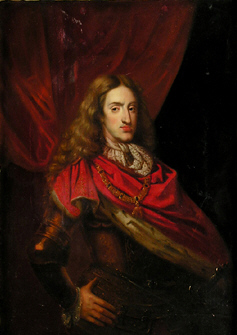
Charles II of Spain (1665–1700), last ruler of Habsburg Spain

In 1665, Charles II of Spain became the last ruler of Habsburg Spain at the age of five. He suffered from ill health most of his life and despite marrying twice, by 1698 it seemed he was likely to die childless. Although Spain's financial and military power had declined during the 17th century, the Spanish Empire remained largely intact, with territories in Italy, the Spanish Netherlands, the Philippines and the Americas. Since the closest heirs were from the Austrian Habsburg and French Bourbon families, the succession was of great significance to the European balance of power and was a matter of debate for many years. For example, in the 1670 Secret Treaty of Dover, Charles II of England agreed to support the claim of Louis XIV of France.

William III of England saw the Partition Treaties as a way of building on the relationship established at the 1697 Treaty of Ryswick with Louis XIV to create a lasting peace. Imposing a solution to such an important issue on Spain and Austria seemed unlikely with the levels of mistrust between both signatories, which had been at war almost continuously since 1670. William negotiated both treaties without notifying either Parliament or his own ministers, a practice still common in France but not in England. Lord Somers, part of the Whig Junto that managed the English government for William, was generally hostile to the provisions of the First Partition Treaty about which he had learned only shortly before its signature.

Few of William's ministers in either England or the Dutch Republic trusted Louis, an impression strengthened when the Marquis d'Harcourt was sent as envoy to Madrid in November 1698 to build Spanish support for a French candidate. The Spanish were unwilling to allow their empire to be partitioned without consultation to suit the needs of foreign powers. On 14 November 1698, Charles published his will, which made the six-year-old Joseph Ferdinand of Bavaria heir to an undivided Spanish Empire and thus ignored the territorial adjustments specified in the First Partition Treaty. When Joseph Ferdinand died of smallpox in February 1699, another solution was required.

== Negotiations ==
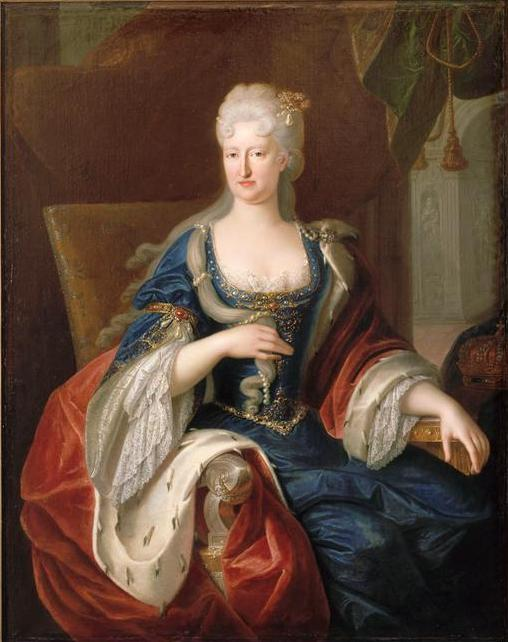
Queen Consort Maria Anna of Neuburg, head of the Austrian faction

The Spanish court was split into pro-Austrian and pro-French factions, the latter being led by Cardinal Portocarrero, Archbishop of Toledo. For much of Charles's reign, his government was controlled by the pro-Austrians, headed by his mother, Mariana of Austria, then following her death in 1696 by his second wife, Maria Anna of Neuburg. Under their influence, Spain joined the anti-French coalition during the Nine Years' War, which proved a disastrous decision. By 1696, France held most of Catalonia, while Spain was forced to declare bankruptcy in 1692; although Maria Anna managed to retain power with the help of spurious rumours of her pregnancy, Charles was forced to banish her German entourage.

For various reasons, the Austrians were unpopular with most of the Spanish nobility, while Charles also resented their arrogance and made it clear to Harcourt that he would not agree to partition the empire. Many Spanish politicians preferred a French candidate since the wars of the last 50 years suggested France was a better ally than opponent, and its location meant it was better equipped to protect Spain than Austria.

After the death of Joseph Ferdinand, Louis's senior foreign policy advisor, the Marquess of Torcy, quickly drew up a draft proposal with revised terms approved in principle by William in June 1699. However, when the suggested treaty was presented to Emperor Leopold, he initially refused the territorial concessions required and as a result the Dutch delayed formal consent. This meant it was not until 12 March 1700 that the treaty was formally signed in London, then in The Hague on 24th.

== Provisions ==
The main change from the First Treaty was to replace Joseph Ferdinand as heir to the Spanish throne with Leopold's younger son Archduke Charles; Spain retained its empire outside Europe and the Spanish Netherlands but France would gain the kingdoms of Naples and Sicily, the Spanish province of Gipuzkoa and exchange the Duchy of Lorraine for the Duchy of Milan. France would then transfer Naples and Sicily to Victor Amadeus II of Sardinia in exchange for the Counties of Nice and Savoy, the transalpine territories of the Savoyard state which finally become part of France after the Second Italian War of Independence in 1859.

Although Leopold accepted the principle of dividing the Spanish Empire in return for making his son king, he objected to France being granted Spanish possessions in Italy, particularly Milan which he considered essential to the security of Austria's southern borders. In addition, Lorraine was an Imperial state occupied by France in 1670 and returned only in 1697, and its recently restored hereditary Duke of Lorraine was Leopold's nephew. As a result, enforcing its terms was unlikely since neither Leopold nor Victor Amadeus would agree the territorial exchanges required, while Spain would not accept even the principle.

== Aftermath ==
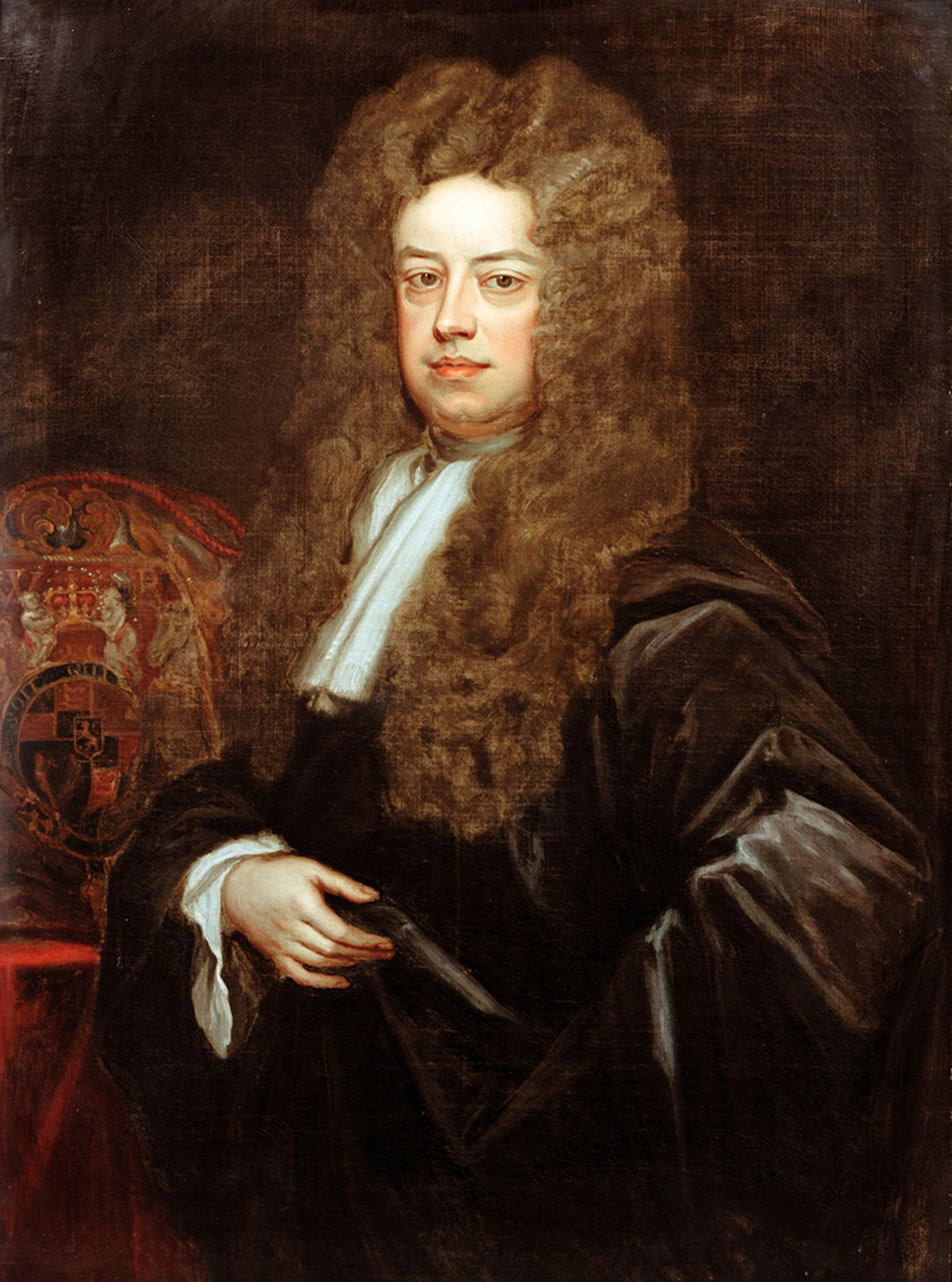
The impeachment of Lord Somers for approving the treaties without informing Parliament established an important English legal principle.

When the Spanish learned of the terms of the Treaty of London in mid-June, Charles amended his will in favour of Archduke Charles and again specified an undivided monarchy. In September, he became ill once more, and by the 28th, he was no longer able to eat. His death seemed imminent, and on 2 October, Portocarrero persuaded him to alter his will in favour of Philip of Anjou, younger son of Louis, Grand Dauphin and grandson of Louis XIV. He died on 1 November 1700, five days before his 39th birthday

When Louis received the formal Spanish offer to Philip on 9 November, one option was to reject it and insist on Archduke Charles accepting the throne as stipulated by the Treaty of London; this meant that if Leopold continued to refuse the territorial concessions, in theory Louis could then call on England and the Dutch Republic to join him in enforcing it. However, it seems unlikely that this was ever seriously considered since as William noted, it made no sense "to go to war...for a treaty I have only made to prevent war". Philip was proclaimed Philip V of Spain on 16 November and the War of the Spanish Succession began in July 1701.

The treaty not only failed to prevent the outbreak of war in 1701 but also demonstrated that monarchs could no longer simply impose their solutions on nation states. When Parliament finally learned of the terms in March 1700, their reaction was one of fury, partly because they were seen as damaging English commercial interests, but also because they had been approved without their knowledge or consent. The Tory majority subsequently attempted to impeach Somers for his role in the negotiations and while unsuccessful, the process embittered relations between the two parties and had a profound impact on British politics over the next two decades.

== Sources ==
- Falkner, James (2015). The War of the Spanish Succession 1701–1714. Pen and Sword. ISBN 978-1-4738-7290-5.
- Gregg, Edward (1980). Queen Anne (Revised) (The English Monarchs Series) (2001 ed.). Yale University Press. ISBN 0300090242.
- Hargreaves-Mawdsley, HN (1979). Eighteenth-Century Spain 1700–1788: A Political, Diplomatic and Institutional History. Macmillan. ISBN 0-333-14612-3.
- Harris, Tim (2006). Restoration: Charles II and His Kingdoms, 1660-1685. Penguin. ISBN 978-0140264654.
- Mckay, Derek; Scott, HM (1983). The Rise of the Great Powers 1648 - 1815 (The Modern European State System). Routledge. ISBN 0582485541.
- Rommelse, Gijs; Onnenkirk, David, eds. (2011). Ideology and Foreign Policy in Early Modern Europe (1650–1750). Routledge. ISBN 978-1409419136.
- Rommelse, Gijs (2011). Ideology and Foreign Policy in Early Modern Europe (1650–1750). Routledge. ISBN 978-1409419136.
- Rule, John (2017). Onnenkirk, David; Mijers, Esther (eds.). The Partition Treaties, 1698-1700 in A European View in Redefining William III: The Impact of the King-Stadholder in International Context. Routledge. ISBN 978-1138257962.
- Sachse, William Lewis (1986). Lord Somers: A political portrait. Manchester University Press. ISBN 071900604X.
- Storrs, Christopher (2006). The Resilience of the Spanish Monarchy 1665-1700. OUP Oxford. ISBN 0199246378.
- Ward, William; Leathes, Stanley (1912). The Cambridge Modern History (2010 ed.). Nabu. ISBN 1174382058.

== Bibliography ==
- Almon, J. (1772). A Collection of All the Treaties of Peace, Alliance, and Commerce, Between Great-Britain and Other Powers: From the Revolution in 1688, to the Present Time. Volume I: 1688–1727. pp. 33–40. (Original text of the treaty in English)
- Jones, JR (1980). Britain and the World, 1649-1815. Fontana Press.
- Rule, John; Trotter, Ben (2014). A World of Paper: Louis XIV, Colbert de Torcy, and the Rise of the Information State. McGill-Queen's University Press.
