= Maria Antonia of Austria =

Electress of Bavaria from 1685 to 1692

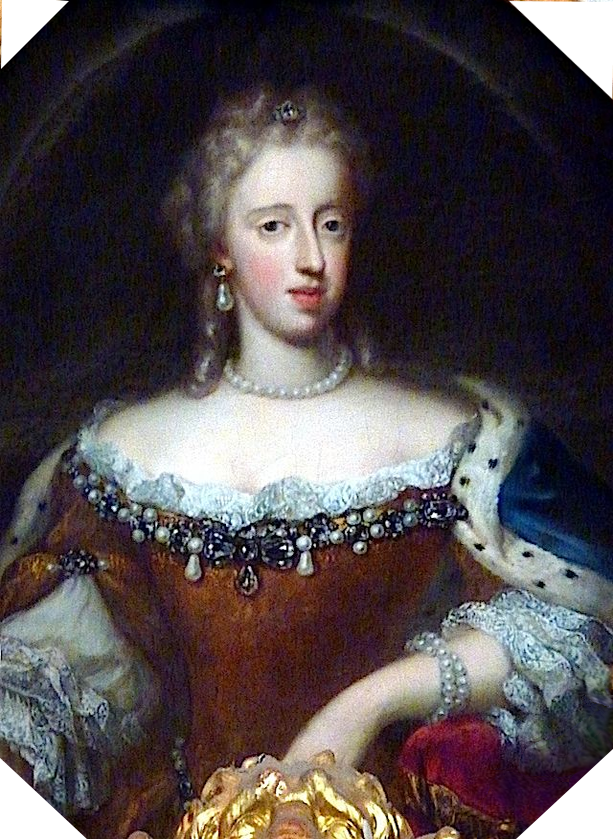

Electress consort of Bavaria
- Tenure: 15 July 1685 – 24 December 1692
- Born: 18 January 1669; Hofburg Palace, Vienna, Archduchy of Austria, Holy Roman Empire
- Died: 24 December 1692 (aged 23); Hofburg Palace, Vienna, Archduchy of Austria, Holy Roman Empire
- Burial: 25 December 1692; Imperial Crypt
- Spouse: Maximilian II Emanuel (m. 1685)
- Issue Detail: Joseph Ferdinand of Bavaria
Names
- Maria Antonia Josepha Benedicta Rosalia Petronella
- House: Habsburg
- Father: Leopold I, Holy Roman Emperor
- Mother: Margaret Theresa of Spain

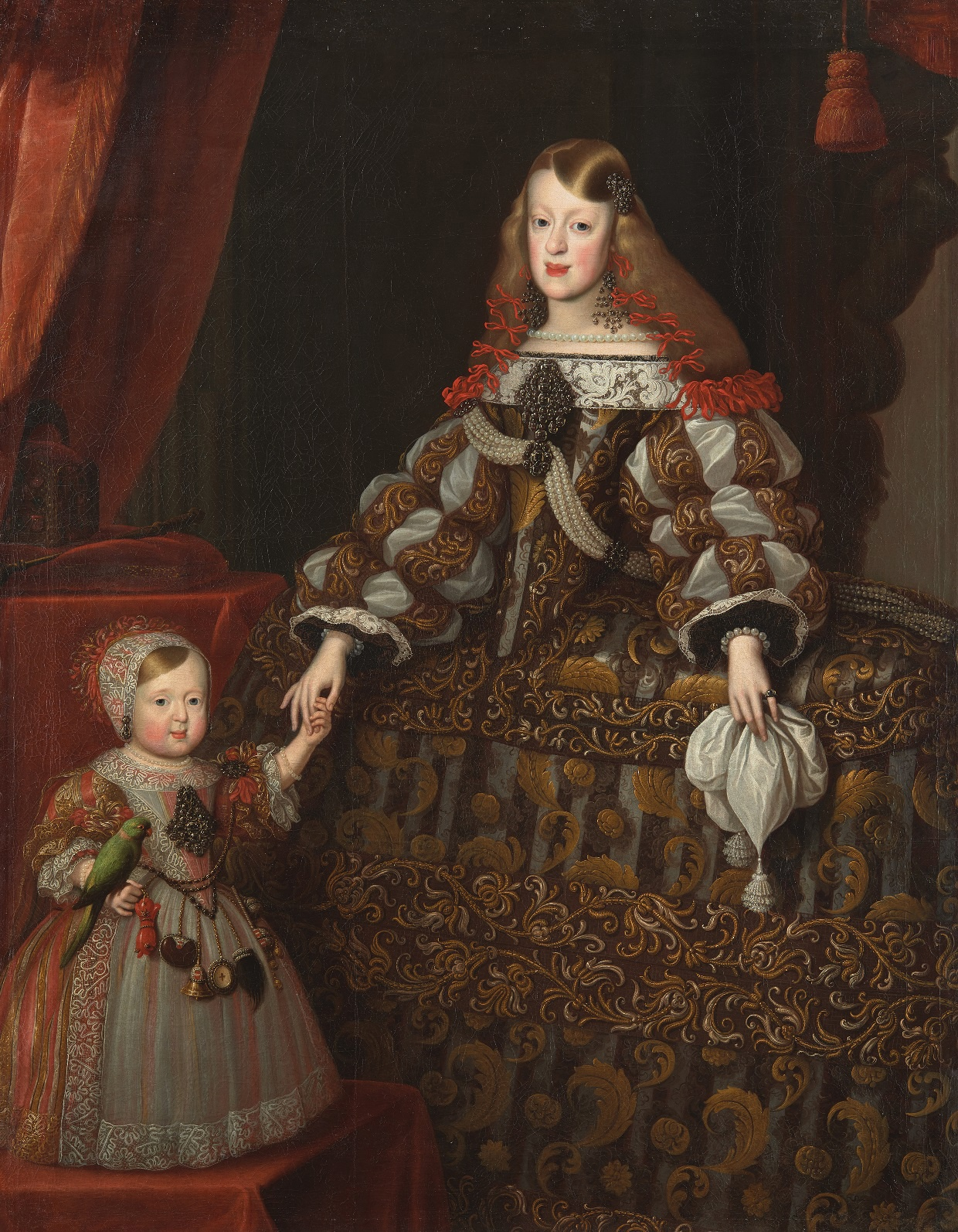
Maria Antonia with her mother, Empress Margaret Theresa of Spain, c. 1670

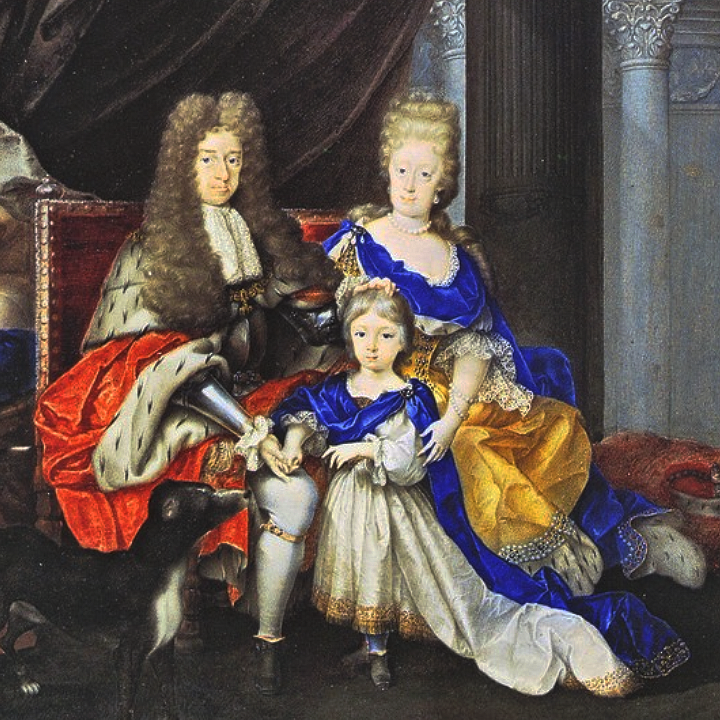
Posthumous depiction with her husband, Maximilian II Emanuel, and only surviving child, Joseph Ferdinand of Bavaria

Maria Antonia of Austria (Marie Antonia von Österreich) (Maria Antonia Josepha Benedicta Rosalia Petronella; 18 January 1669 – 24 December 1692) was the eldest daughter and only surviving child of Holy Roman Emperor Leopold I and his first wife Margaret Theresa of Spain. As a granddaughter of King Philip IV of Spain, she became heiress presumptive to Habsburg Spain when her mother died in 1673. She became the consort of Maximilian II Emanuel, Elector of Bavaria, upon her marriage in 1685. Maria Antonia died on 24 December 1692, just weeks after the birth of her third and only surviving son, Joseph Ferdinand of Bavaria.

The early deaths of Maria Antonia and her sons, which were likely indirectly due to generations of inbreeding, left the Kingdom of Spain without a ruler upon the death of Charles II of Spain in 1700. This led to the War of the Spanish Succession (1701-1714), in which 700,000 people died in 13 years.

Maria Antonia was found to have the highest coefficient of inbreeding in the House of Habsburg. Her parents were maternal uncle and niece and paternal first cousins once removed, and her maternal grandparents were also uncle and niece.

== Biography ==
=== Early life ===
Archduchess Maria Antonia was born at Hofburg Palace in Vienna on 18 January 1669," the eldest daughter of Leopold I, Holy Roman Emperor and his first wife, Infanta Margaret Theresa of Spain, who was also his niece; they were in an avunculate marriage. Her mother died at age 21 when Maria Antonia was 2 years old and her only older sibling had already died by the time she was born. She had two younger siblings, both of whom died in infancy, and twelve half-siblings, six of whom lived into adulthood.

Maria Antonia was a significant figure in the Viennese court's musical culture and was a patron and enthusiast of Baroque music. However, her music teacher was killed in 1683 in the siege by the Ottoman Empire or the resulting Battle of Vienna.

=== Heiress to Habsburg Spain and marriage ===
Charles II of Spain never fathered any children and when Empress Margaret Theresa of Spain, died in 1673, Maria Antonia was considered by both Charles II and the Spanish Monarchy "as the legal and most direct heir to her uncle’s throne". However, Leopold I considered himself to be the heir and wished to conceal her status from society. Portraits depicting Maria Antonia station her as just an archduchess "without any sign of her special consideration as heiress or the succession rights she possessed to her uncle’s territories."

During her childhood, she was considered to be sent for marriage to either Charles II of Spain or Victor Amadeus II, the Duke of Savoy. However, on 15 July 1685, at age 16, Maria Antonia was forced to marry Maximilian II Emanuel in Vienna, making her the electress of the Electorate of Bavaria.

Maria Antonia's grandmother, Mariana of Austria, Queen of Spain, wanted the descendants of her daughter Margaret Theresa of Spain to inherit Habsburg Spain. The marriage gave the Bavarian Wittelsbachs the closer place in succession to the Crown than the Austrian Habsburgs.

However, Maria Antonia's father, Leopold I, Holy Roman Emperor, wanted Charles VI, Holy Roman Emperor, then known as Archduke Charles, a son from his third marriage, to be the heir instead of Maria Antonia. Leopold I pressured Maria Antonia, at age 12, to sign a document waiving her inheritance rights in order to be granted permission to marry Maximilian II Emanuel. In exchange, he promised to have Maximilian II Emanuel appointed as governor of the Spanish Netherlands.

The marriage was very unhappy. The extroverted Maximilian, a military leader, and the introverted and serious Maria Antonia had little in common. Maria Antonia was reportedly offended by Maximilian's constant infidelity. In late 1691, when Maximilian was appointed governor of the Spanish Netherlands and left for Brussels with his mistress, Countess Canozza, despite Maria Antonia being pregnant, Maria Antonia left Munich to her father in Vienna to give birth, and it was widely assumed that the marriage was effectively over and she did not intend to return to Maximilian.

=== Death and aftermath ===
In December 1692, two months after giving birth to her third child, Maria suffered from melancholia, now believed to be postpartum depression. She then was infected by streptococcus pyogenes, which had a mortality rate of 50% in the time before antibiotics. She suffered from fever and abdominal pain, which progressed to systemic infection likely exacerbated by her genetic load resulting from inbreeding.

Maria Antonia died on Christmas Eve, 24 December 1692, aged 23, at Hofburg Palace. She is buried in the Imperial Crypt in Vienna, next to her mother. After the death of Maria Antonia of Austria, her only surviving son, Joseph Ferdinand of Bavaria, was a claimant to the throne of Spain. However, he died in 1699 at age 6 from typhoid fever or smallpox and the resulting seizures. If he had survived, the European powers might have permitted him to accede to the throne of Spain under the terms of the Treaty of The Hague (1698). However, the death of Charles II of Spain in 1700 left Hapsburg Spain without a ruler, triggering the War of the Spanish Succession (1701-1714), in which 700,000 people died in 13 years.

== Family ==
Maria Antonia had the highest coefficient of inbreeding in the House of Habsburg, 0.3053, higher than that of a child born to a parent and offspring, or brother and sister: her father was her mother's maternal uncle and paternal first cousin once removed, and her maternal grandparents were uncle and niece. However, despite this extreme inbreeding, she managed to survive childhood and reach adulthood, although she was the only one among her siblings to do so. She did not display any noticeable physical deformities that are normally accompanied by inbreeding, although portraits, before and especially after her death, proudly presented her as heir to the Spanish throne. Her genetics likely exacerbated the infection that led to her death.

=== Ancestors ===
Ancestors of Maria Antonia of Austria

Philip III of Spain; 1578–1621	Margaret of Austria; 1584–1611	Ferdinand II; Holy Roman Emperor; 1578–1637	Maria Anna of Bavaria; 1574–1616
Maria Anna of Spain; 1606–46	Ferdinand III; Holy Roman Emperor; 1608–57
Philip IV of Spain; 1605–65	Mariana of Austria; 1634–96
Margaret Theresa of Spain; 1651–1673	Leopold I Holy Roman Emperor; 1640–1705
Maria Antonia of Austria; 1669–1692

=== Issue ===
1. Leopold Ferdinand of Bavaria (22 May 1689) – died at birth
2. Anton of Bavaria (19 November 1690) – died at birth
3. Joseph Ferdinand of Bavaria (28 October 1692 – 6 February 1699) – heir to the Spanish throne, died at age 6 from typhoid fever or smallpox and the resulting seizures (or allegedly arsenic poisoning by Leopold I, Holy Roman Emperor); his death led to the War of the Spanish Succession

== Bibliography ==
- Friedrich Weissensteiner: Liebeshimmel und Ehehöllen - Heyne Taschenbuchverlag 1999 - ISBN 3-453-17853-X
- Frey, Linda; Frey, Marsha (1983). A Question of Empire: Leopold I and the War of Spanish Succession, 1701–1705. New York: Columbia University Press. pp. 6, 13, 14. ISBN 0-88033-038-4.
- Langdon-Davies, John (1963). Carlos: The King Who Would Not Die. Englewood Cliffs, NJ: Prentice Hall.
- Mitchell, Silvia Z. (2013). Mariana of Austria and Imperial Spain: Court, Dynastic, and International Politics in Seventeenth-Century Europe (Doctor of Philosophy (PhD) thesis).
- Mitchell, Silvia Z. (2019-05-30). Queen, Mother, and Stateswoman: Mariana of Austria and the Government of Spain. Penn State Press. ISBN 978-0-271-08412-1.
- Spielman, John Philip (1977). Leopold I. London: Thames and Hudson. ISBN 978-0-500-87005-1.
- Wheatcroft, Andrew (1996). The Habsburgs: Embodying Empire. London: Penguin Books. ISBN 978-0-14-023634-7.
