= Treaty of The Hague (1698) =

1698 treaty between France, Great Britain and the Dutch republic

Treaty of the Hague (1698)
First Treaty of Partition between Great Britain, France and the United Provinces
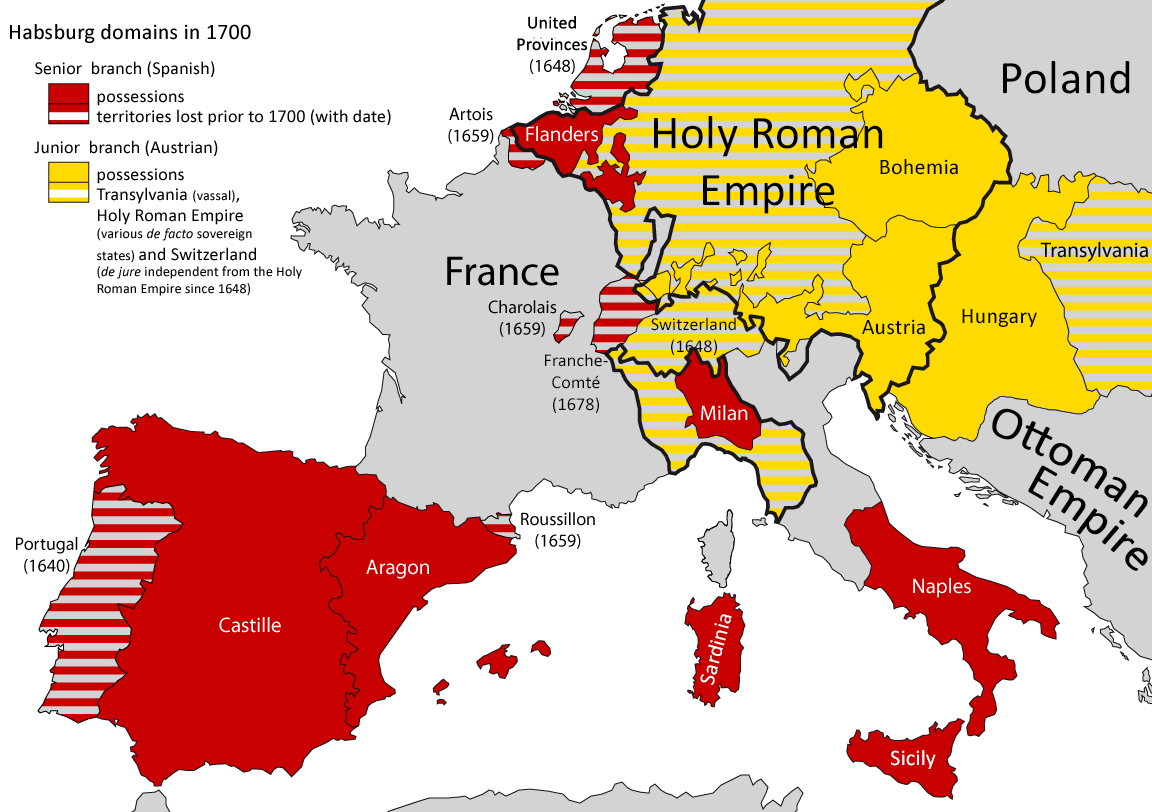
- Habsburg possessions in Spain (red), and Austria (yellow)
- Context: Concerns over the inheritance of Charles II of Spain
- Signed: 11 October 1698
- Location: The Hague
- Negotiators: (Kingdom of France) Marquis de Pomponne; (Kingdom of England) Earl of Portland; (Dutch Republic) Anthonie Heinsius
- Signatories: (Kingdom of France) Tallard; (Kingdom of England) Earl of Portland; (Dutch Republic) Various (Note: Frans Verbolt, for Gelderland; Van Reede & Anthonie Heinsius, Holland; Johan Becker, Zeeland; Van der Does, Utrecht; Van Haaren, Friesland; Lencker, Overijssel; de Drews, Groningen)
- Parties: France; Dutch Republic; England

The 1698 Treaty of The Hague, also known as the 1698 Treaty of Den Haag or First Partition Treaty was one of two attempts by France, Great Britain, and the Dutch Republic to achieve a diplomatic solution to the issues that led to the 1701–1714 War of the Spanish Succession.

The death of Charles II had been anticipated from his succession in 1665, but by 1697 appeared clearly imminent. As he was childless, the closest heirs were of the Austrian Habsburg monarchy or the French House of Bourbon. The acquisition by either of the undivided Spanish Empire would change the European balance of power.

Negotiations took place immediately after the financially crippling Nine Years' War (1688-97) to attempt to resolve the issue without another expensive war. Signed on 11 October 1698, the treaty made the six-year-old Joseph Ferdinand of Bavaria heir to the Spanish throne, with Spain's European possessions divided between France and Austria.

However, neither Austria nor Spain was consulted, and the Spanish refused to accept the division of their empire. The death of Joseph Ferdinand in February 1699 led to the Second Partition Treaty, or Treaty of London, in March 1700.

== Background ==
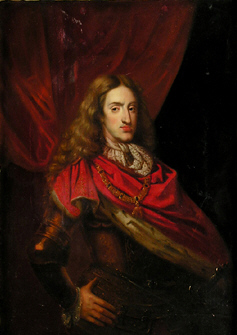
Charles II, 1665–1700; last Habsburg King of Spain

In 1665, Charles II became the last Habsburg King of Spain. He had suffered from ill health for most of his life and by 1697 seemed likely to die childless. Although Spain's financial and military power had declined during the 17th century, the Spanish Empire remained powerful and largely intact, with territories in Italy, the Spanish Netherlands, the Philippines and large areas of the Americas. Since his closest heirs were from the ruling Austrian Habsburg and French Bourbon families, the succession was of great significance to the European balance of power and a matter of debate for many years. For example, it had been referenced in the 1670 Secret Treaty of Dover between England and France and the 1689 Grand Alliance.

From 1665, Louis XIV fought a series of wars to achieve defensible borders and establish French military supremacy in Europe, most recently the 1688–1697 Nine Years' War against the Grand Alliance. The war ended with the Treaty of Ryswick, producing only minor gains for France, and Louis accepted that he could not achieve his objectives without external support. While Charles had survived far longer than anyone expected, his health was clearly in terminal decline, and France needed allies.

Louis's concern was increased by Austrian victories over the Ottoman Empire and resulting conquest of Hungary and Transylvania. The resulting growth in Habsburg power and confidence meant Emperor Leopold I initially refused to sign the Treaty of Ryswick, as it left the succession unresolved. He did so in October 1697, but many viewed the treaty as only a pause in hostilities.

== Negotiations ==
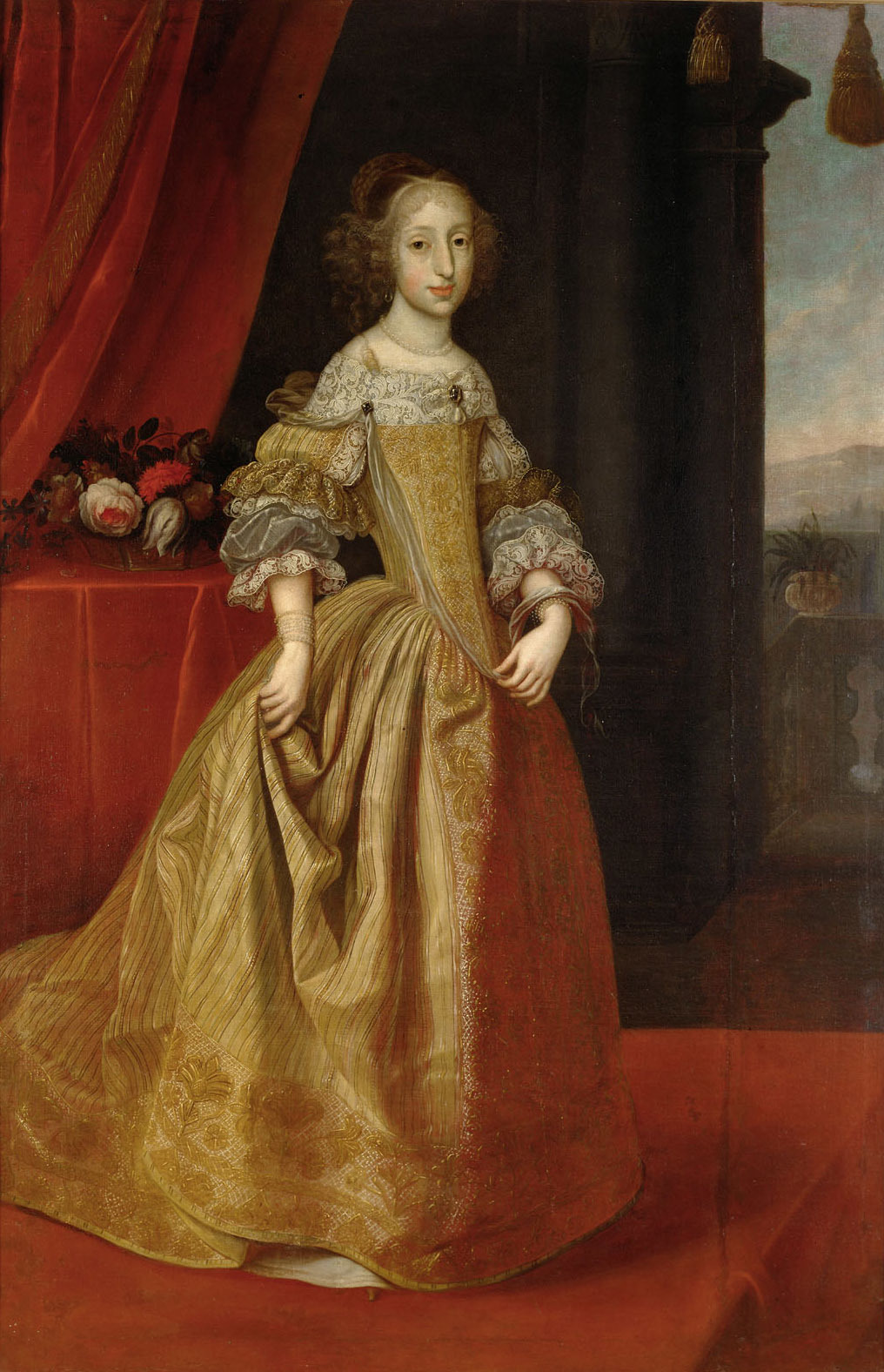
Maria Antonia (1669–1692), electress of Bavaria, heir to the Spanish throne (1669–1692) and the mother of Joseph Ferdinand

Unlike those of Austria and France, the crown of Spain could be inherited through the female line, which would enable Charles's two sisters to pass their rights onto their children. They both had one surviving child. His half-sister Maria Theresa (1638–83) married Louis XIV and had a son Louis, known as le Grand Dauphin. His full sister, Margaret Theresa (1651–1673), married Emperor Leopold. Their daughter Maria Antonia (1669–1692) married Maximillian Emanuel, Elector of Bavaria, and they had one surviving son, Joseph Ferdinand.

The Spanish political establishment was split between pro-Austrian and pro-French factions. For most of Charles's reign, government was controlled by the Austrians, led by his mother, Mariana of Austria. After her death in 1696, that role was assumed by his wife, Maria Anna, whose elder sister Eleonore was Leopold's third wife.

When Charles fell seriously ill in 1698, the dominance of the Austrian faction made co-operation with Britain an attractive option for Louis. William III was a significant figure in Europe because of his military leadership of the Grand Alliance during the Nine Years' War and his dual role as King of England and Stadtholder of the Dutch Republic. The conflict was not only a dynastic dispute between Habsburgs and Bourbons but also an issue that affected the security of England and the Dutch Republic.

The French Army remained on a war footing, but by 1699, the English Army had been reduced to 7,000, with another 12,000 in Ireland. That made a diplomatic solution attractive to William, even if it was only temporary, and provided an opportunity to create a framework for a lasting peace. Talks on ending the Nine Years' War began in 1694 but were completed only in 1697 after Louis had negotiated directly with William. As a result, they placed great faith in a similar process to prevent war over the succession, but it had excluded Austria and Spain, the two parties that were most affected.

Initial discussions were held in Paris between the Earl of Portland and the Marquis de Pomponne, followed by more substantive talks at The Hague beginning in May with Anthonie Heinsius, Grand Pensionary of Holland, and the French foreign minister, the duc de Tallard. On 11 October 1698, the treaty was signed by Tallard on behalf of France, Portland for England, and eight representatives from the Dutch Provinces.

== Provisions ==
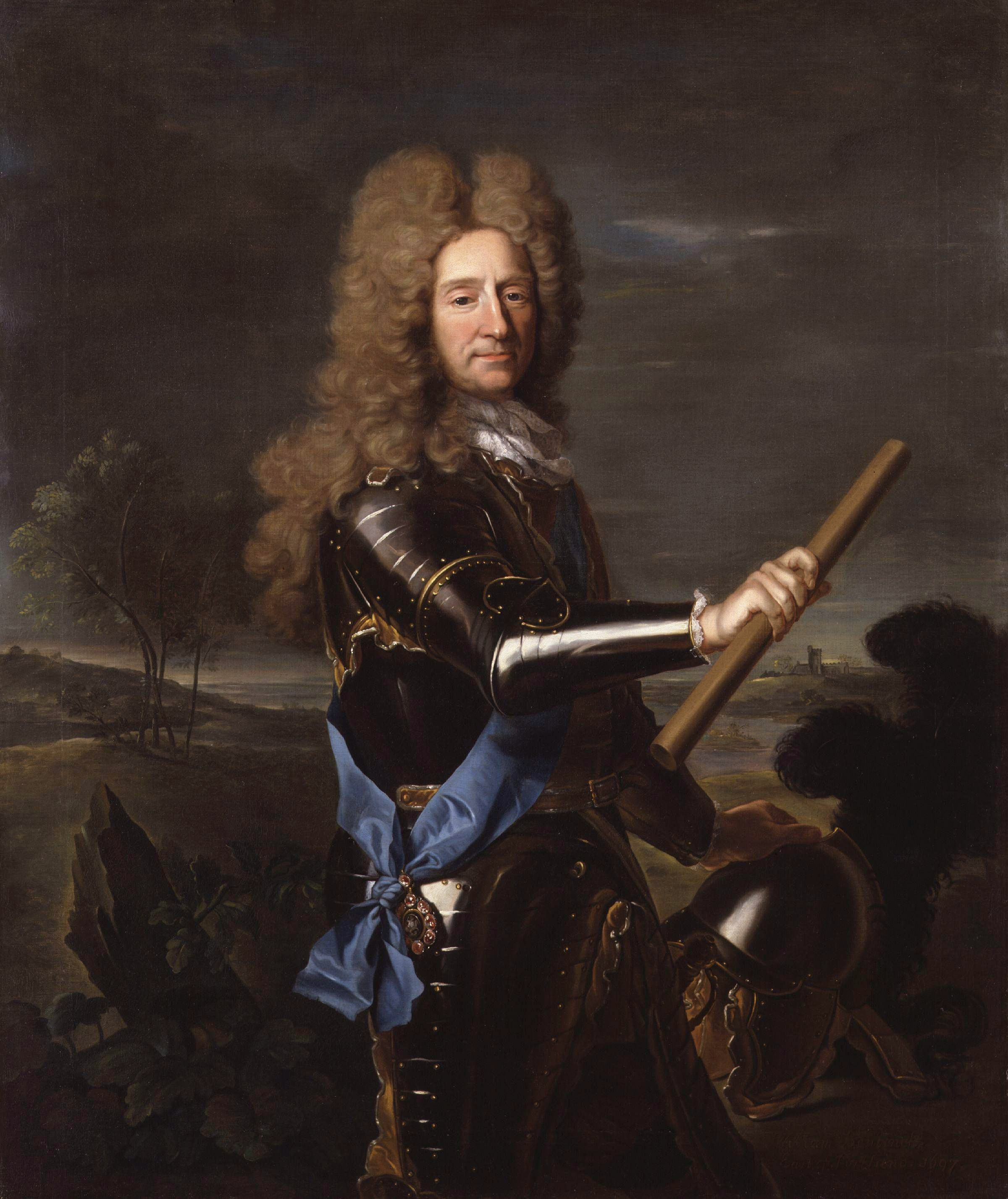
The Earl of Portland, William's chief envoy in France

Louis XIV first proposed his son, the Grand Dauphin, as Charles's successor, but that was rejected. The parties compromised by selecting Joseph Ferdinand of Bavaria. That was supported by Charles' German wife, Maria Anna, a member of the House of Wittelsbach, a family whose head was Max Emmanuel of Bavaria, Joseph Ferdinand's father.

The treaty's provisions made Joseph Ferdinand heir to the bulk of the Spanish Empire, which included the Spanish Netherlands, which was governed by Max Emmanuel as Spanish viceroy. France was allocated the Kingdoms of Naples and Sicily and other concessions in Italy as well as the modern Basque province of Gipuzkoa. Finally, Leopold's younger son Archduke Charles became ruler of the Duchy of Milan, a possession that was considered vital to the security of Austria's southern border.

Negotiations were conducted in secret, which was normal practice for the absolutist regime of Louis XIV but not in England. The senior English legal officer, Lord Chancellor Somers, learned of its terms shortly before the treaty was signed on 11 October. His reaction was unfavourable, but since the treaty had been agreed, he could see no means of undoing it.

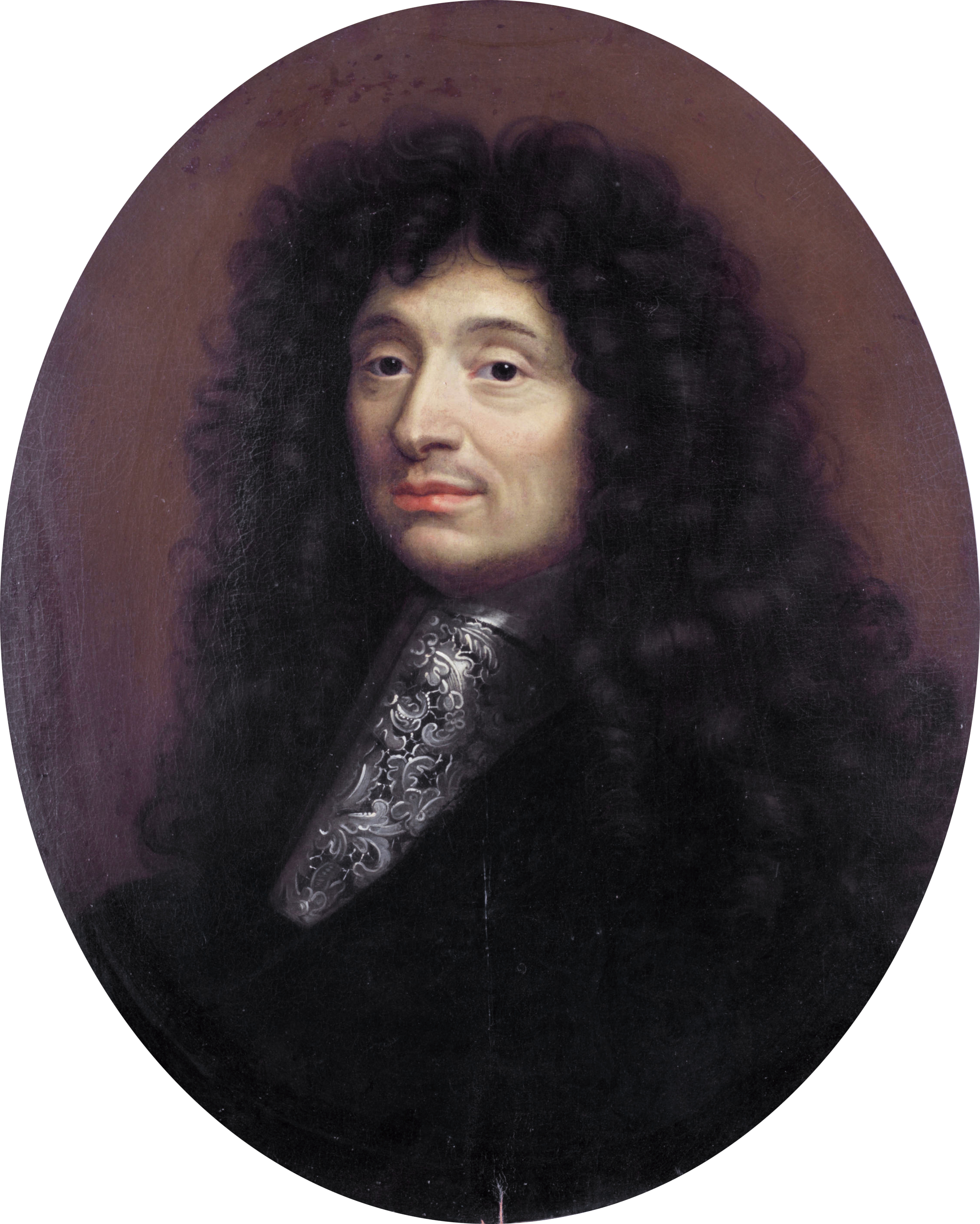
Marquis de Pomponne (1618–1699), chief French negotiator

== Aftermath ==
The Spanish refused to have their empire divided without being consulted, and on 14 November 1698, Charles II published his will making Joseph Ferdinand heir to an independent and undivided Spanish Empire. Maria Anna was appointed Queen Regent during his minority, a decision allegedly received by his Spanish councillors in silence.

In February 1699, Joseph Ferdinand died of smallpox, then a common disease, despite the accusations of poison that often accompanied the death of significant people. Whether he would have become king if he had survived is open to question since few seemed keen on the treaty. One suggestion is Louis saw it as a delaying tactic to build Spanish support for a French candidate. However, the three parties involved began negotiating the Second Partition Treaty, also known as the Treaty of London.

== Sources ==
- Jones, J. R. (1980). Britain and the World, 1649–1815. Fontana Press. ISBN 0006337589.
- Meerts, Paul Willem (2014). Diplomatic negotiation: Essence and Evolution. Leiden University Dissertation. hdl:1887/29596.
- Rule, John (2017). "A European View in Redefining William III: The Impact of the King-Stadholder in International Context". In Onnekink, David; Mijers, Esther (eds.). The Partition Treaties, 1698–1700. Routledge. ISBN 978-1138257962.
- Onnekink, David (2007). The Anglo-Dutch Favourite: The Career of Hans Willem Bentinck, 1st Earl of Portland (1649–1709). Routledge. ISBN 978-1138259317.
- Rommelse, Gijs (2011). Ideology and Foreign Policy in Early Modern Europe (1650–1750). Routledge. ISBN 978-1409419136.
- Rule, John; Trotter, Ben (2014). A World of Paper: Louis XIV, Colbert de Torcy, and the Rise of the Information State. McGill-Queen's University Press. ISBN 978-0773543706.
- Rule, John (2017). "A European View in Redefining William III: The Impact of the King-Stadholder in International Context". The Partition Treaties, 1698–1700. Routledge. ISBN 978-1138257962.
- Sachse, William Lewis (1986). Lord Somers: A political portrait. Manchester University Press. ISBN 071900604X.
- Storrs, Christopher (2006). The Resilience of the Spanish Monarchy 1665–1700. OUP Oxford. ISBN 0199246378.
- Ward, William; Leathes, Stanley (1912). The Cambridge Modern History (2010 ed.). Nabu. ISBN 1174382058.
