= Charles II of Spain =

King of Spain from 1665 to 1700

Charles II
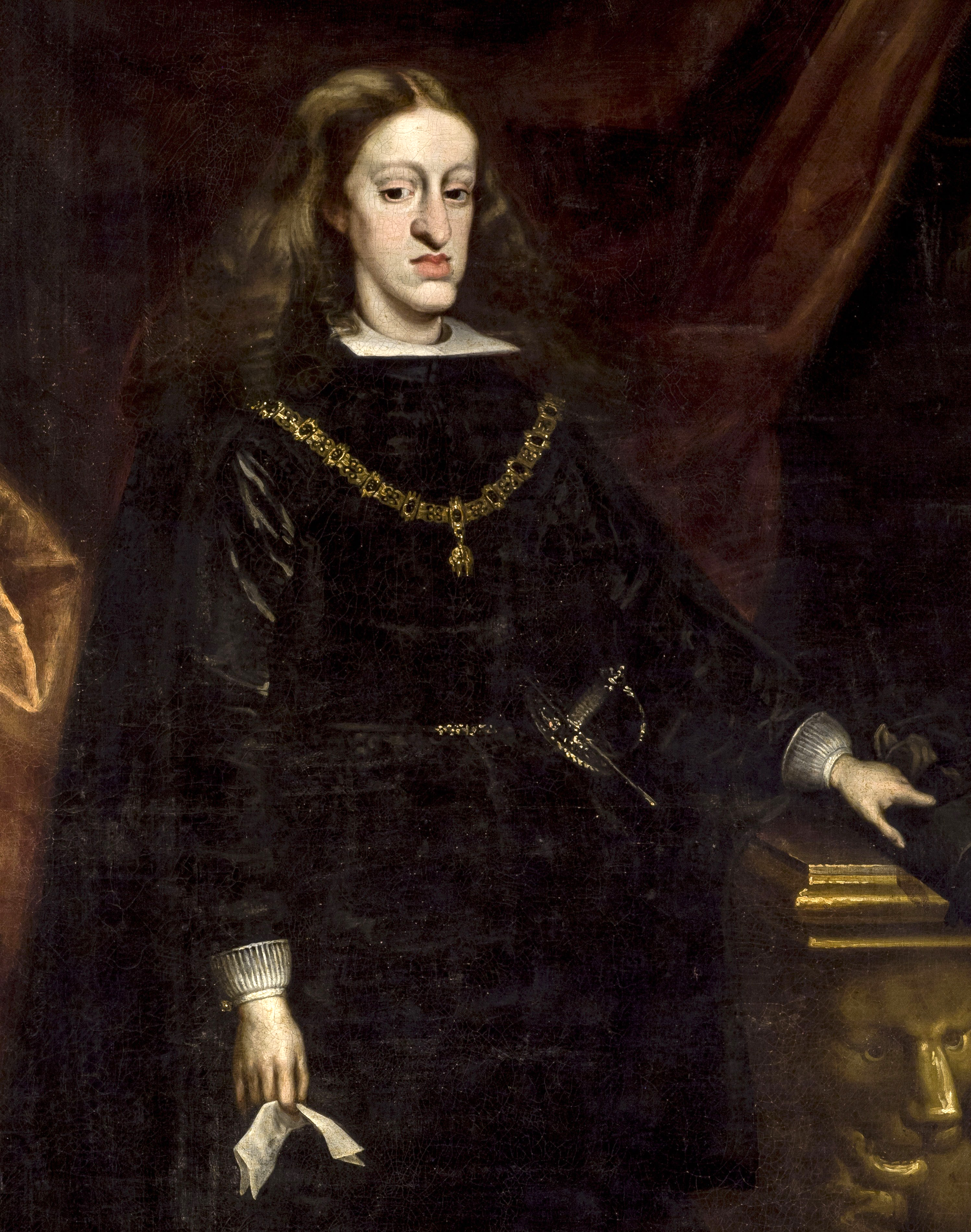
- Portrait by Juan Carreño de Miranda, c. 1685

King of Spain
- Reign: 17 September 1665 – 1 November 1700
- Predecessor: Philip IV
- Successor: Philip V
- Regent: Mariana of Austria (1665–1675)
- Born: 6 November 1661; Madrid, Spain
- Died: 1 November 1700 (aged 38); Madrid, Spain
- Burial: Monasterio del Escorial
- Spouses: Marie Louise d'Orléans (m. 1679; died 1689) Maria Anna of Neuburg (m. 1689)
- House: Habsburg
- Father: Philip IV of Spain
- Mother: Mariana of Austria

Charles II (Note: Spanish: Carlos II) (Note: Also known as The Bewitched or Spanish: El Hechizado) (6 November 1661 – 1 November 1700) was King of Spain from 1665 to 1700. The last member of the House of Habsburg to rule Spain, his death without children resulted in the 1701 to 1714 War of the Spanish Succession.

For reasons still debated, Charles experienced lengthy periods of ill health throughout his life. This made the question of who would succeed him central to European diplomacy for much of his reign, historian John Langdon-Davies writing that "from the day of his birth, they were waiting for his death".

The leading candidates for the succession were Charles of Austria, younger son of Leopold I, Holy Roman Emperor, and Philip of Anjou, 16-year-old grandson of Louis XIV of France. Charles made the latter his heir shortly before dying in November 1700, but the acquisition of an undivided Spanish Empire by either candidate threatened the European balance of power and resulted in war.

== Birth and upbringing ==
Born on 6 November 1661, Charles was the only surviving son of Philip IV of Spain and Mariana of Austria, his second wife and niece. Marriage within the same extended family was then common among the nobility, (Note: Largely to ensure the retention of lands and property) but the Spanish and Austrian Habsburgs were unusual in the extent to which they followed this practice. Of eleven marriages contracted by Spanish monarchs between 1450 and 1661, most contained some element of consanguinity, Philip and Mariana being one of two unions between an uncle and his niece. (Note: Avunculate marriages, or those between uncle and niece, or aunt and nephew, were unusual but not unknown; examples from this period include Maximilian of Bavaria and his niece Maria Anna in 1635, Prince Maurice of Savoy and Princess Luisa Cristina of Savoy in 1642, while Charles's sister Margaret Theresa of Spain married her uncle Leopold I, Holy Roman Emperor in 1666. It remains legal in states including Norway, Chile, Canada, Argentina, Australia, Finland, the Netherlands, Germany and Russia) This policy may also have been driven by limpieza de sangre or "blood purity" statutes enacted in the early 16th century, which remained in force until the 1860s.

Intramarriage accentuated the so-called "Habsburg jaw", a physical characteristic common in both Spanish and Austrian Habsburgs. One contemporary reported this was so pronounced in Charles that he swallowed his food without thoroughly chewing, leading to frequent stomach problems. A 2019 study based on an analysis of Habsburg portraits concluded this feature was likely due to a recessive trait, but in the absence of genetic material, such claims remain speculative.

The precise causes of Charles's ill-health remain disputed, especially as neither his elder sister, Margaret, who married her maternal uncle Leopold I, nor their child and his niece María, had similar health issues. Based on contemporary accounts, some modern researchers suggest hydrocephalus derived from a herpetic infection incurred as an infant.

After his birth, he was entrusted to the royal governess Mariana Engracia Álvarez de Toledo Portugal y Alfonso-Pimentel. Under her careful supervision, he survived childhood attacks of measles, chickenpox, rubella and smallpox, any one of which was then potentially fatal. He also had rickets, which left him unable to walk unaided until he was four and required him to wear leg braces until the age of five. (Note: Rickets was common in the 17th century, even among the aristocracy; other examples include Charles I of England)

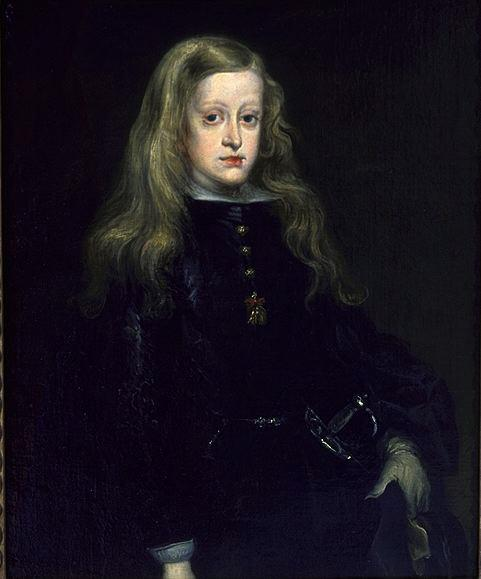
Charles as a child, c. 1673

Despite these physical challenges, suggestions that Charles remained largely uneducated into his teens are incorrect. Ramos del Manzano, a legal expert from the University of Salamanca, was appointed his tutor when he was six. From the age of 12, he received lessons in music from Juan del Vado and mathematics from José Zaragoza, a professor at the Colegio Imperial de Madrid.

The extent of his physical and mental disabilities is hard to assess, since little is known for certain, and many claims are either unproven or incorrect. While prone to illness, he was extremely active physically, and contemporaries reported he spent much of his time hunting. One often cited example of his alleged mental incapacity is the period he spent sleeping with his father's disinterred body; this was in fact done under instructions from Mariana, whose doctors advised this would help him produce an heir.

Although reputedly subject to bouts of depression, his participation in government and reports from his council and observers including the French ambassador indicate his mental capacities remained intact. A report from 1691 submitted by an envoy of the Sultan of Morocco, relates that he was received by Charles himself, who played a full part in the discussions. Costanzo Operti, a Savoyard diplomat who attended regular audiences with Charles during the Nine Years' War, described him as affable and generous but shy and lacking self-confidence, characteristics noted by other foreign diplomats.

== Reign ==
=== Regency years ===
Since Charles was a minor when Philip died on 17 September 1665, Mariana was appointed Queen Regent by the Council of Castile. The Spanish Empire remained an enormous global confederation, but its economic supremacy was challenged by England and the Dutch Republic, and its position in Europe weakened by the expansionist policies pursued by Louis XIV of France. Enacting reforms was hampered by the rivalry between Mariana and Charles's illegitimate elder half-brother, Don Juan. In addition, Spain was a personal union between the Crown of Castile and Crown of Aragon, each with very distinct political cultures and traditions. (Note: The Crown of Aragon was divided into the autonomous Kingdoms of Aragon, Valencia, Majorca, Naples, Sicily, Sardinia, and the Principality of Catalonia.)

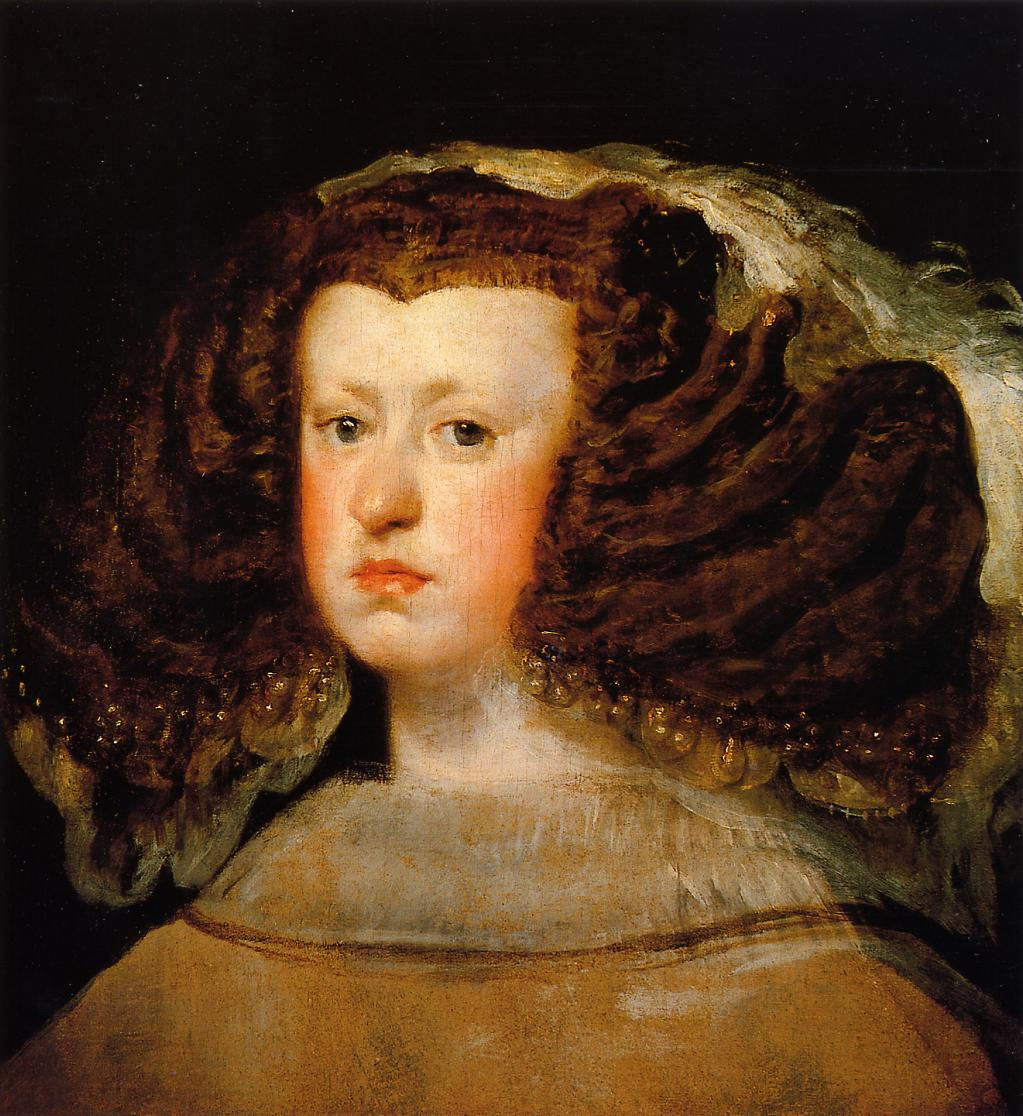
Mariana of Austria by Diego Velázquez, c. 1656, Regent for Charles during his minority

Government finances were in perpetual crisis, the Crown declaring bankruptcy nine times between 1557 and 1666, including 1647, 1652, 1662, and 1666. Despite these issues, it is debatable how far Charles himself, or those who ruled in his name, can be held responsible for long-term trends predating his reign. The monarchy proved remarkably resilient, and remained largely intact on his death in 1700.

Mariana followed the custom established by her husband, and ruled through a "valido", (Note: Often translated as "favourite", but more properly refers to a chief advisor) the first being her personal confessor and fellow Austrian, Juan Everardo Nithard. His most urgent task was ending the costly wars with France and Portugal, which he duly achieved through the 1668 treaties of Aix-la-Chapelle and Lisbon. Despite acknowledging their necessity, in February 1669 Don Juan forced Mariana to dismiss Nithard. She replaced him with Fernando de Valenzuela, a member of the lower hidalgo class, whose appointment was resented by the Grandees who normally filled such positions.

In 1673, Spain was drawn into the Franco-Dutch War, placing additional strain on the economy, and Don Juan renewed efforts to remove Mariana as Regent. A month before Charles became a legal adult on 6 November 1675, he indicated his intention to take control of government, supported by his brother. When the Regency Council requested a two-year extension of their office on 4 November, Charles initially refused, but was later pressured into accepting. He was also forced to issue a Royal Decree ordering Don Juan to leave Madrid.

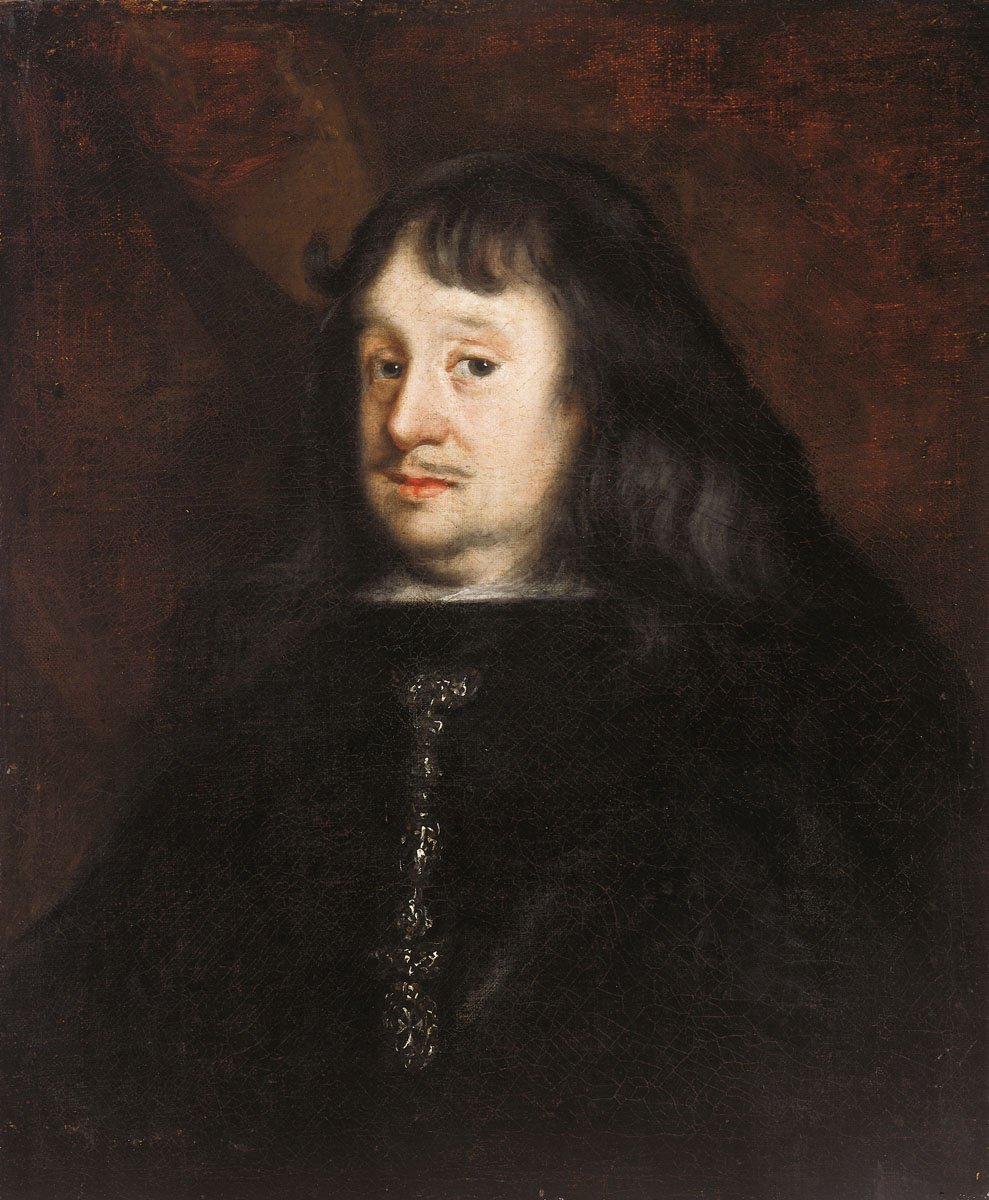
Charles's illegitimate half-brother, John Joseph of Austria, whose political feud with his mother undermined the stability of his regime

Don Juan finally gained control of the government in January 1678 and exiled Valenzuela to the Philippines. His first action was to make peace with France in the 1678 Treaties of Nijmegen, with Spain ceding Franche-Comté and areas of the Spanish Netherlands returned in 1668. Seeking to minimise future conflict between the two countries, in August 1679 Don Juan brokered a match between Charles and the 17-year-old Marie Louise of Orléans, eldest niece of Louis XIV and daughter of Philippe I, Duke of Orléans. Arranging the marriage was Don Juan's last significant act; he died shortly before it took place in November 1679. Some members of the Spanish government initially opposed the marriage, but ultimately accepted it since peace with France was more important.

In February 1680, Juan Francisco de la Cerda, 8th Duke of Medinaceli became the new valido. He clashed with Marie-Louise over the alleged influence exerted over her by the French ambassador, Pierre de Villars, who was expelled from Madrid in 1681, badly affecting the relationship between the two. Medinaceli was further undermined by economic problems and the loss of Luxembourg following the 1683 War of the Reunions. In June 1684, he sought to bolster his support by appointing the Count of Oropesa as President of the Council of Castile, the second most powerful position in the state. However, continuing ill-health led him to resign in April 1685, with Oropesa taking over as de facto valido. He retained this position until 1690.

=== Economy ===
The so-called "Little Ice Age" of the 17th century was a period of crisis throughout Europe, leading to poor harvests and economic decline. Spain was especially affected, due in part to the parlous economic situation, particularly in Castile, where the population dropped from 6.5 million in 1600 to fewer than 5 million in 1680, whilst figures for Spain as a whole were 8.5 to 6.6 million. This was exacerbated by a series of wars with France and the need to defend the Empire, which were a constant drain on public expenditure. In 1663, Philip IV had converted state debt into government bonds (juros) but high rates of interest meant taxes were often assigned to creditors years in advance to pay current liabilities. Although silver bullion imports from the Americas increased, the vast majority went to paying off foreign debtors.

The globalisation of the Spanish trading system meant foreign interests often had the most to lose from its collapse. By the 1670s, exports were primarily controlled by Dutch and English merchants, while the domestic economy relied on French labour and imported wheat. A senior colonial official observed in 1687 that the Empire continued to exist "only because it enables the English, Dutch and French to exploit [it] more cheaply".

One consequence of Spanish economic and demographic weakness during this period was the inability of the Spanish Navy to protect their own merchant shipping. In response, the government issued royal decrees in 1674 and 1692 establishing a formal system of privateering in the Spanish coastal territories, known as the guarda costa outside Europe. Hundreds of privateers were commissioned during the last decade of Charles' rule, a policy continued by his successors. Charles himself acquired at least one corsair ship in 1684, the San Antonio, in order to encourage private initiative.

In the 1680s, Spanish officials issued a series of drastic deflationary decrees, revaluing the coinage at 25% of its previous value. The immediate impact was the total disruption of commerce and collapse of financial credit; in response, debtors were given three months to repay government debts using the existing rate, later extended to six months. Having stabilised the position, however, in 1686 the coinage was readjusted to a more favourable rate and thereafter left unaltered.

== Succession conflict and death ==
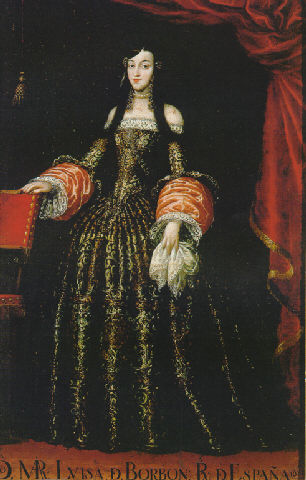
Marie Louise d'Orléans, Charles's French first wife

Blamed for Charles's failure to produce an heir, Marie Louise was subjected to primitive fertility treatments that caused her severe health problems. She died in February 1689, shortly after the outbreak of the Nine Years' War with France, probably from appendicitis. (Note: Despite contemporary suggestions of poison, this claim was extremely common in an era when many illnesses were poorly understood.) A new wife was selected from a family famous for its fertility, Maria Anna of Neuburg, daughter of Philip William, Elector Palatine, and sister-in-law to Emperor Leopold. A proxy marriage took place in August 1689 before a formal ceremony in May 1690.

Maria Anna also failed to produce an heir, almost certainly because Charles was incapable of doing so, as his autopsy later revealed his sole remaining testicle was atrophied. His mother died on 16 May 1696, by which time Charles' health was clearly failing, making the succession increasingly urgent. Since the Crown of Spain passed according to cognatic primogeniture, it could be inherited through the female line. This enabled Charles' sisters Maria Theresa and Margaret Theresa to pass their rights to the children of their marriages with Louis XIV and Emperor Leopold. However, to prevent a union between Spain and France, Maria Theresa had renounced her inheritance rights on her marriage, in return for which Louis was promised a dowry of 500,000 gold écus, a huge sum that was never paid.

The Peace of Ryswick which ended the Nine Years' War in 1697 was the result of mutual exhaustion, and left the issue of the succession unresolved. Leopold I, Holy Roman Emperor reluctantly signed the treaty in October 1697, but viewed it as a temporary pause in hostilities. Leopold and Margaret's daughter Maria Antonia had married Maximilian II Emanuel, Elector of Bavaria, and they had a son before her death in 1692, Joseph Ferdinand. In the Treaty of The Hague (1698), England, France and the Dutch Republic attempted to impose a diplomatic solution by making him heir to the bulk of the Spanish monarchy, with France gaining Naples, Sicily and the Spanish province of Gipuzkoa. In return, Leopold's younger son Charles was made ruler of Milan, a possession considered vital to the security of Austria's southern border.

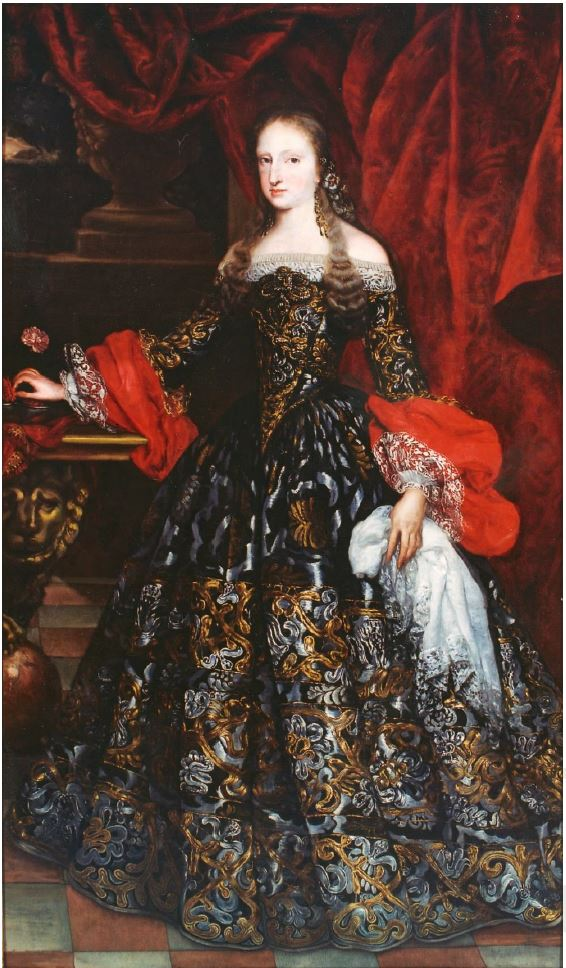
Maria Anna of Neuburg, Charles's pro-Austrian second wife

The Spanish government refused to approve any division of their territories, although they accepted Joseph Ferdinand as Charles's successor. The death of Joseph Ferdinand in 1699 from smallpox led to the Treaty of London (1700), which made Archduke Charles the new heir, with Spanish possessions in Europe split between France, Savoy and Austria. Charles altered his will in favour of the Archduke, but once again stipulated an undivided Spanish monarchy. In September 1700, Charles fell ill and by 28 September he was no longer able to eat. Luis Manuel Fernández de Portocarrero persuaded him to appoint Louis XIV's grandson, Philip of Anjou, as his heir. He died on 1 November 1700, at age 38. The autopsy records his "heart was the size of a peppercorn; his lungs corroded; his intestines rotten and gangrenous; he had a single testicle, black as coal, and his head was full of water." The latter suggests hydrocephalus, a disease often associated with childhood measles, one of many illnesses contracted by Charles. Philip was proclaimed king of Spain on 16 November 1700, and the War of the Spanish Succession formally began on 9 July 1701.

== Legacy ==
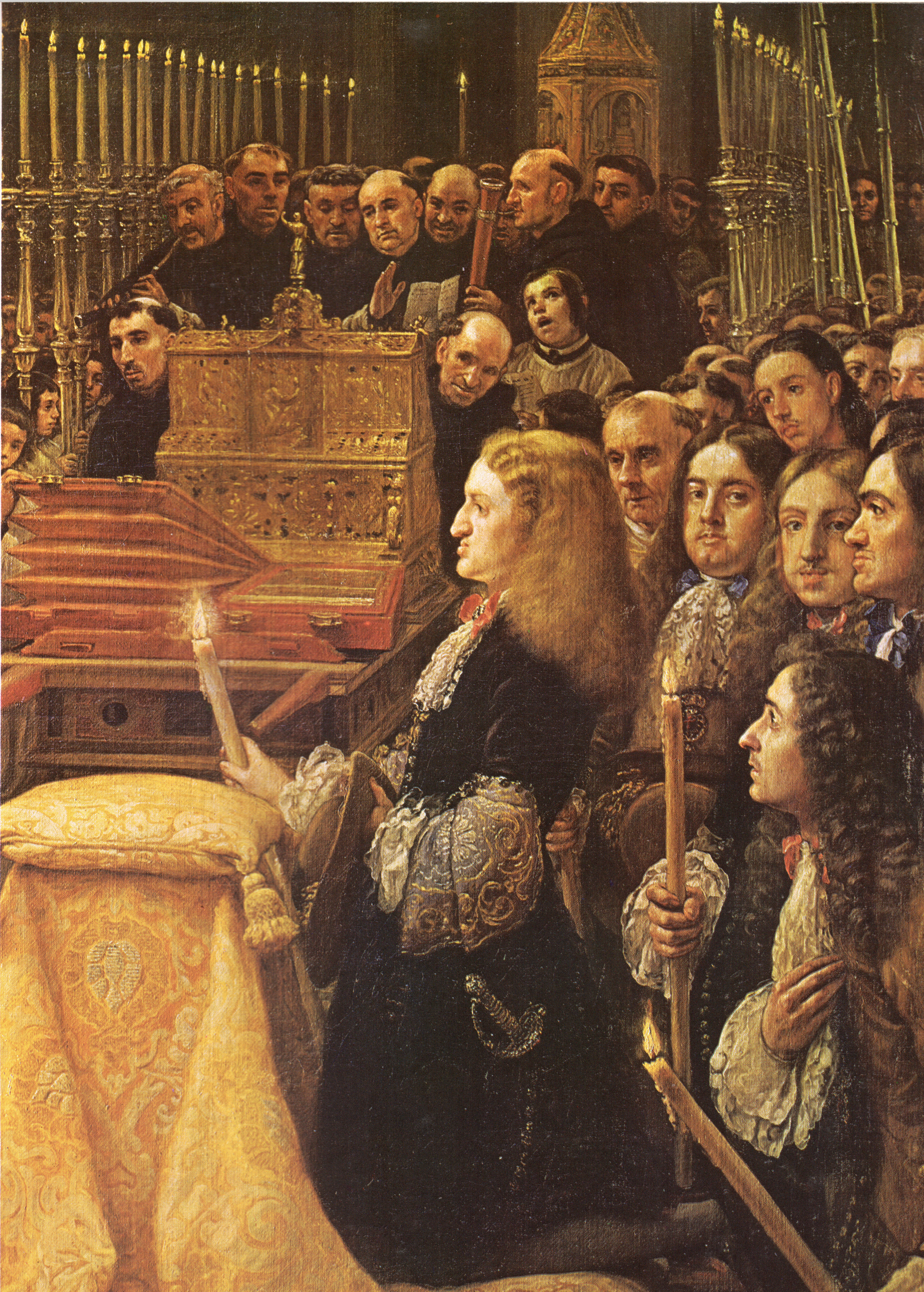
Charles II adores the Holy Eucharist (detail), by Claudio Coello, one of the last and most significant examples of Spanish Baroque painting

On 7 November 1693, a Royal Decree provided sanctuary in Spanish Florida for escaped slaves from the English Province of South Carolina. Florida provided protection from storms in the Gulf of Mexico for Spanish merchant shipping. The decree was intended to bolster its population while undermining the neighbouring colony, which claimed the Spanish capital of St Augustine. Formalised in 1733 by Philip V, it led to the founding in 1738 of Santa Teresa de Mose, the first legally sanctioned free black town in the present-day United States.

The Caroline Islands were named after Charles in 1666, as was the town of Charleroi in modern Belgium in 1686. Decrees were also issued in his name approving universities in South America that still exist. In Peru, they included San Cristóbal, established in 1680, and the National University; in Guatemala, the Universidad de San Carlos de Guatemala, the fourth-oldest university on the continent. Others included Santo Tomas Aquino in 1688, now part of the Central University of Ecuador, and finally in 1694 the Universidad de San Nicolás de Mira in Bogotá, Colombia.

Though not as fond of the arts as his father, Charles employed artists such as the Italian painter Luca Giordano and Claudio Coello to decorate El Escorial. In 1690 the latter created one of the last and most significant examples of Spanish Baroque painting, Charles II adores the Holy Eucharist.

== Assessment ==
Charles's reign has been viewed as one of decline and decay, a foreign ambassador commenting in 1691 "it is incomprehensible how this monarchy survives". More recent studies argue "both the myth of decline and an incapable king are simplistic and inexact", while historian Luis Ribot García suggests he was "neither so bewitched, nor so decadent" as previously figured. Traditional historiography portrayed Charles as both ineffectual and mentally disabled, emblematic of the decline of Habsburg Spain after the wars of the 17th century. However, more recent scholarship argues these views were heavily influenced by their Bourbon successors, who used propaganda to diminish the previous dynasty.

Despite their disastrous short-term impact, the financial measures taken by his advisors ended the chronic instability which had affected the Spanish currency throughout the 17th century, and helped drive sustainable economic growth. Its long term has been considered historically remarkable, exemplified by the deflation achieved during his reign. Many of the commercial and political policies initiated under Charles formed the basis for reforms enacted by his Bourbon successors. Spain's role in the European wars of his reign has also been reevaluated, with his army still relevant in the various anti-French alliances, and retaining the empire's core territories.

Family tree of claimants to the Spanish throne following the death of Charles II

Philip III; King of Spain; 1578–1621	Margaret of Austria; 1584–1611
Ferdinand III; Holy Roman Emperor; 1608–1657	Maria Anna of Spain; 1606–1646
Anne of Austria; 1601–1666	Elisabeth of France; 1602–1644	Philip IV; King of Spain; 1605–1665	Mariana of Austria; 1635–1696
Louis XIV; King of France; 1638–1715	Maria Theresa of Spain; 1638–1683	Charles II; King of Spain; 1661–1700	Margaret Theresa of Spain; 1651–1673	Leopold I Holy Roman Emperor; 1640–1705	Eleonore Magdalene of Neuburg; 1655–1720
Louis; Grand Dauphin of France; 1661–1711	Maria Antonia of Austria; 1669–1692	Charles VI; Holy Roman Emperor; 1685–1740
Louis; Petit Dauphin of France; 1682–1712	Philip V King of Spain; 1683–1746	Charles; Duke of Berry; 1686–1714	Joseph Ferdinand of Bavaria; 1692–1699

Notes
Potential heirs are shown with a golden border. In cases of second marriages, the earlier spouse is to the left and the later to the right.
References
- Durant, W.; Durant, A. (2011). The Age of Louis XIV: The Story of Civilization. New York: Simon & Schuster. ISBN 9781451647655.
- Kamen, H. (2001). Philip V of Spain: The King Who Reigned Twice. New Haven: Yale University Press. ISBN 9780300180541.

== Heraldry ==
Heraldry of Charles II of Spain

Coat of arms as King of Spain (1665–1668)	Coat of arms as King of Spain (1668–1700)	Coat of arms as King of Naples & Sicily (1665–1700)	Coat of arms as Duke of Milan (1665–1700)
Lesser coat of arms as King of Naples (1665–1668)	Coat of arms as King of Naples & Sicily (1665–1700)	Coat of arms as King of Navarre (1665–1700)	Coat of arms as King of Galicia (1665–1700)

== Ancestry ==
Ancestors of Charles II of Spain
Thick red borders indicate children of consanguinity, where parents were at least second cousins.

Philip I King of Castile (Note: Charles V, Holy Roman Emperor at the Encyclopædia Britannica); 1478–1506	Joanna; Queen of Castile and Aragon; 1479–1555
Isabella of Portugal; 1503–1539	Charles V Holy Roman Emperor; 1500–1558	Ferdinand I Holy Roman Emperor (Note: Press, Volker (1990). "Maximilian II.". Neue Deutsche Biographie (in German). Vol. 16. Berlin: Duncker & Humblot. pp. 471–475. (full text online).); 1503–1564	Anna of Bohemia and Hungary; 1503–1547	Isabella of Austria; 1501–1526	Christian II; King of Denmark; 1481–1559
Maria of Austria; 1528–1603	Maximilian II; Holy Roman Emperor; 1527–1576	Anna of Austria; 1528–1590	Albert V Duke of Bavaria; 1528–1579	Christina of Denmark; 1522–1590	Francis I Duke of Lorraine; 1517–1545
Philip II; King of Spain; 1527–1598	Anna of Austria; 1549–1580	Charles II; Archduke of Austria (Note: Eder, Karl (1961). "Ferdinand II.". Neue Deutsche Biographie (in German). Vol. 5. Berlin: Duncker & Humblot. pp. 83–85. (full text online).); 1540–1590	Maria Anna of Bavaria; 1551–1608	William V Duke of Bavaria; 1548–1626	Renata of Lorraine; 1544–1602
Philip III; King of Spain; 1578–1621	Margaret of Austria; 1584–1611	Ferdinand II; Holy Roman Emperor; 1578–1637	Maria Anna of Bavaria; 1574–1616
Maria Anna of Spain; 1606–1646	Ferdinand III; Holy Roman Emperor; 1608–1657
Philip IV; King of Spain; 1605–1665	Mariana of Austria; 1634–1696
Charles II; King of Spain; 1661–1700

== Sources ==
- Alvarez, Gonzalo; Ceballos, Francisco; Celsa, Quintero (2009). "The Role of Inbreeding in the Extinction of a European Royal Dynasty". PLOS One. 4 (4) e5174. Bibcode:2009PLoSO...4.5174A. doi:10.1371/journal.pone.0005174. PMC 2664480. PMID 19367331.
- Barton, Simon (2009). A History of Spain. Palgrave Macmillan. ISBN 978-0-230-20011-1.
- Beltrán, Alvarez; Carmen, Edna Lucía del (2012). Proyecto de intervención para el claustro Colegio San Nicolás de Mira de la Órden de los Agustinos Calzados de Nuestra Señora de Gracia en Bogotá. Piel, huellas, indicios. 2 7 5 años en pie (Master in Conservation of Real Estate Heritage). National University of Colombia.
- Bittles, Grant JC (2002). "Does inbreeding lead to decreased human fertility?". Human Biology. 29 (2): 111–130. doi:10.1080/03014460110075657. PMID 11874619. S2CID 31317976.
- Bordas, C.; Robledo, L. (1998). "José Zaragozá's Box: Science and Music in Charles II's Spain". Early Music. XXVI (3): 391–413. doi:10.1093/earlyj/XXVI.3.391. JSTOR 3128699.
- Borgognoni, Ezequiel (2018). "The Royal Household of Marie-Louise of Orleans, 1679–1689: The Struggle over Executive Offices". Court Historian. 23 (2): 166–181. doi:10.1080/14629712.2018.1539449. S2CID 159873391.
- Callaway, Ewen (19 April 2013). "Inbred Royals Show Traces of Natural Selection". Nature News. doi:10.1038/nature.2013.12837. S2CID 87959487.
- Calvo, Poyato J (1998). La vida y la época de Carlos II el Hechizado (in Spanish). Planeta. ISBN 978-84-08-02615-0.
- Cowans, Jon (2003). Modern Spain: A Documentary History. U. of Pennsylvania Press. ISBN 0-8122-1846-9.
- De Vries, Jan (2009). "The Economic Crisis of the 17th Century". Journal of Interdisciplinary Studies. 40 (2).
- Darby, Graham (2014). Spain in the Seventeenth Century. Taylor and Francis. ISBN 978-1-317-89771-2.
- Dhondt, Frederik (2016). From Contract to Treaty: the Legal Transformation of the Spanish Succession (1659–1713) (PDF). Legal History Institute, Ghent University.
- Dubcovsky, Alejandra (2016). Informed Power: Communication in the Early American South. Harvard University Press. ISBN 978-0-674-66018-2.
- Dunford, Martin; Lee, Phil (1999). Rough Guide to Belgium & Luxembourg. Rough Guides. ISBN 978-1-85828-871-0.
- Durant, Ariel; Durant, Will (1935). The Story of Civilization: The age of Louis XIV, 1648-1715 (2015 ed.). Simon and Schuster.
- Falkner, James (2015). The War of the Spanish Succession 1701–1714. Pen and Sword. ISBN 978-1-4738-7290-5.
- Fox, Philip D (2013). The Bourbon Reform of Spanish Absolutism: The Government of the Crown of Aragon, 1665-1746 (PDF) (PHD). University of Kansas.
- Garcia, Bernardo José; Alvariño, Antonio Álvarez Ossorio, eds. (2015). Vísperas de Sucesión: Europa y la Monarquía de Carlos II (in Spanish). Fundación Carlos de Amberes. ISBN 978-84-87369-79-7.
- García-Escudero López, Ángel; Arruza Echevarría, A; Padilla Nieva, Jaime; Puig Giró, Ramon (2009). "Charles II; from spell to genitourinary pathology". History of Urology. 62 (3).
- Gargantilla, P (2005). Enfermedades de los reyes de España. Los Austrias: de la locura de Juana a la impotencia de Carlos II el Hechizado (in Spanish). La Esfera De Los Libros S.L. ISBN 978-84-9734-338-1.
- Hargreaves-Mawdsley, HN (1979). Eighteenth-Century Spain 1700–1788: A Political, Diplomatic and Institutional History. Macmillan. ISBN 0-333-14612-3.
- Horne, Alistair (2005). La Belle France. Alfred A. Knopf. ISBN 978-1-4000-4140-4.
- Kamen, Henry (1965). The Spanish Inquisition: A Historical Revision. Yale University Press. ISBN 0-300-18051-9.
- Kamen, Henry (2001). Philip V of Spain: The King who Reigned Twice. Yale University Press. ISBN 0-300-08718-7.
- Kamen, Henry (2002). Spain's Road to Empire (2003 ed.). Allen Lane. ISBN 978-0-14-028528-4.
- Kamen, Henry (1964). "The Decline of Castile: The Last Crisis". The Economic History Review. 17 (1): 63–76. doi:10.2307/2592691. JSTOR 2592691.
- Keevil, J.J (1954). "The Illness of Charles, Duke of Albany (Charles I), from 1600 to 1612: An Historical Case of Rickets". Journal of the History of Medicine and Allied Sciences. IX (4): 407–419. doi:10.1093/jhmas/IX.4.407. PMID 13212027.
- Landers, Jane (1984). "Spanish Sanctuary: Fugitives in Florida, 1687-1790". Florida Historical Quarterly. 62 (3): 296–313. JSTOR 30146288.
- Langdon-Davies, John (1963). Carlos; the King Who Would Not Die. Prentice Hall.
- Lozano, Christina Bravo (2018). Spain and the Irish Mission, 1609-1707. Routledge. ISBN 978-1-138-63676-7.
- Maffi, Davide (2020). Los últimos tercios. El Ejército de Carlos II. Desperta Ferro. ISBN 978-8-412-20798-9.
- Martin, Andrew; Heard, Robert; Fung, Victor (2021). "Carlos II of Spain, 'The Bewitched': cursed by aspartylglucosaminuria?". BMJ Neurology Open. 3 (2): 215–218. doi:10.1136/bmjno-2020-000072. PMC 8477247. PMID 34632386.
- Martínez López, Rocío (2015). Labrador Arroyo, Félix (ed.). II Encuentro de Jóvenes Investigadores en Historia Moderna. Líneas recientes de investigación en Historia Moderna (in Spanish). Universidad Rey Juan Carlos.
- Maura, Gabriel (1879). Carlos II y su Corte (in Spanish) (2018 ed.). Wentworth Press. ISBN 978-0-274-53825-6.
- McKay, Derek; Scott, HM (1983). The Rise of the Great Powers 1648–1815 (The Modern European State System). Routledge. ISBN 0-582-48554-1.
- Meerts, Paul Willem (2014). Diplomatic negotiation: Essence and Evolution (Thesis). Leiden University dissertation. hdl:1887/29596.
- Mitchell, Sylvia Z (2013). Mariana of Austria and Imperial Spain: Court, Dynastic, and International Politics in Seventeenth- Century Europe (PHD). University of Miami.
- Mitchell, Sylvia (2014). Cruz, Anne; Stampino, Maria (eds.). Habsburg Motherhood: The Power of Mariana of Austria, Queen Regent for Carlos II of Spain in "Early Modern Habsburg Women: Transnational Contexts, Cultural Conflicts, Dynastic Continuities". Routledge. ISBN 978-1-4724-1164-8.
- Nada, John (1962). Carlos the Bewitched: The Last Spanish Habsburg 1661-1700. Jonathan Cape.
- Roca Barea, María Elvira (2019). Fracasología: España y sus élites: de los afrancesados a nuestros días. Espasa.
- Ribot García, Luis Antonio (2006). El arte de gobernar. Estudios sobre la España de los Austrias. Alianza. ISBN 9788420647807.
- Ribot, Luis (2018). "Epilogue; Carlos II: A Reign under Revision". The Court Historian. 23 (2): 215–218. doi:10.1080/14629712.2018.1546462. ISSN 1462-9712. S2CID 159834135.
- Rico, Ángel (2015). "La defensa del mar en tiempos de Carlos II. Los corsarios de la monarquía hispánica". Revista general de marina (PDF) (in Spanish). MES.
- Rule, John (2017). Onnekink, David; Mijers, Esther (eds.). The Partition Treaties, 1698-1700; A European View in Redefining William III: The Impact of the King-Stadholder in International Context. Routledge. ISBN 978-1-138-25796-2.
- Rommelse, Gijs (2011). Ideology and Foreign Policy in Early Modern Europe (1650–1750). Routledge. ISBN 978-1-4094-1913-6.
- Santaliestra, Olivan Laura (2014). "The Childhood of the Infantas Maria Teresa and Margarita Maria at Court". In Coolidge, Grace E (ed.). The Formation of the Child in Early Modern Spain. Ashgate Publishing. ISBN 978-1-47-242880-6.
- Stanhope, Alexander (1840). Spain Under Charles the Second; Extracts from the Correspondence of the Hon. Alexander Stanhope, British Minister at Madrid 1690-1699. John Murray.
- Stanley, JT (1868). "Account of an Embassy from Marocco to Spain in 1690 and 1691". Journal of the Royal Asiatic Society of Great Britain and Ireland. 3 (2): 359–378. doi:10.1017/S0035869X00015823. JSTOR 44012105. S2CID 161613952.
- Storrs, Christopher (2006). The Resilience of the Spanish Monarchy 1665–1700. OUP Oxford. ISBN 0-19-924637-8.
- Sullivan, E. J (1985). "Politics and Propaganda in the Sagrada Forma by Claudio Coello". The Art Bulletin. 67 (2): 243–259. doi:10.2307/3050910. JSTOR 3050910.
- Testino-Zafiropaulus, Alexandra (2015). "Querellas Politicas en torno al Conde de Oropesa en las postrimerias del reinado de Carlos II" (PDF). Revue d'études romanes (in Spanish) (2).
- Turliuc, Cucu, AI (2019). "Hydrocephalus of King Charles II of Spain, the Bewitched King". European Neurology. 81 (1–2): 76–78. doi:10.1159/000500719. PMID 31112979.
- Vilas, Román (2019). ""Habsburg Jaw" Facial Deformity in Royal Dynasty Linked to Inbreeding". Annals of Human Biology. 46 (7–8): 553–561. doi:10.1080/03014460.2019.1687752. PMID 31786955. S2CID 208536371.
- Villanueva, Cecilia Font de (2006). "Monetary reform in times of Charles II (1679 - 1686): Aspects concerning the issued dispositions" (PDF). Departamento de Historia Económica e Instituciones, Universidad Carlos III de Madrid.
- Ward, William; Leathes, Stanley (2010) [First published 1912]. The Cambridge Modern History. Nabu. ISBN 978-1-174-38205-5.
- Wolf, John B (1968). Louis XIV. Norton & Co. ISBN 978-0-575-00088-9.

Charles II of Spain House of Habsburg Born: 6 November 1661 Died: 1 November 1700
Regnal titles
Preceded by Philip IV	King of Spain, Sardinia, Naples, and Sicily; Duke of Milan, Lothier, Brabant, Limburg and Luxemburg; Count of Flanders, Hainaut and Namur; 1665–1700	Succeeded by Philip V
Preceded by Philip IV	Count Palatine of Burgundy; 1665–1678	Annexed by France
Spanish royalty
Vacant Title last held by Philip Prospero	Prince of Asturias; 1661–1665	Vacant Title next held by Louis Philip
