= Joseph Ferdinand of Bavaria =

Electoral Prince of Bavaria (1692-1699)

Joseph Ferdinand
- Electoral Prince of Bavaria
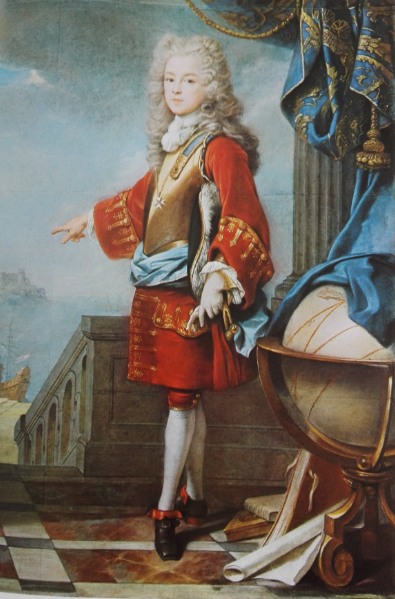
- Josef Ferdinand by Joseph Vivien in 1698
- Born: 28 October 1692; Hofburg Palace, Vienna
- Died: 6 February 1699 (aged 6); Brussels, Spanish Netherlands
- House: House of Wittelsbach
- Father: Maximilian II Emanuel
- Mother: Maria Antonia of Austria

Joseph Ferdinand Leopold of Bavaria (28 October 1692 – 6 February 1699) was the son of Maximilian II Emanuel, Elector of Bavaria (1679–1705, 1714–1726), and his first wife, Maria Antonia of Austria, daughter of Leopold I, Holy Roman Emperor, and granddaughter of King Philip IV of Spain.

== Youth ==
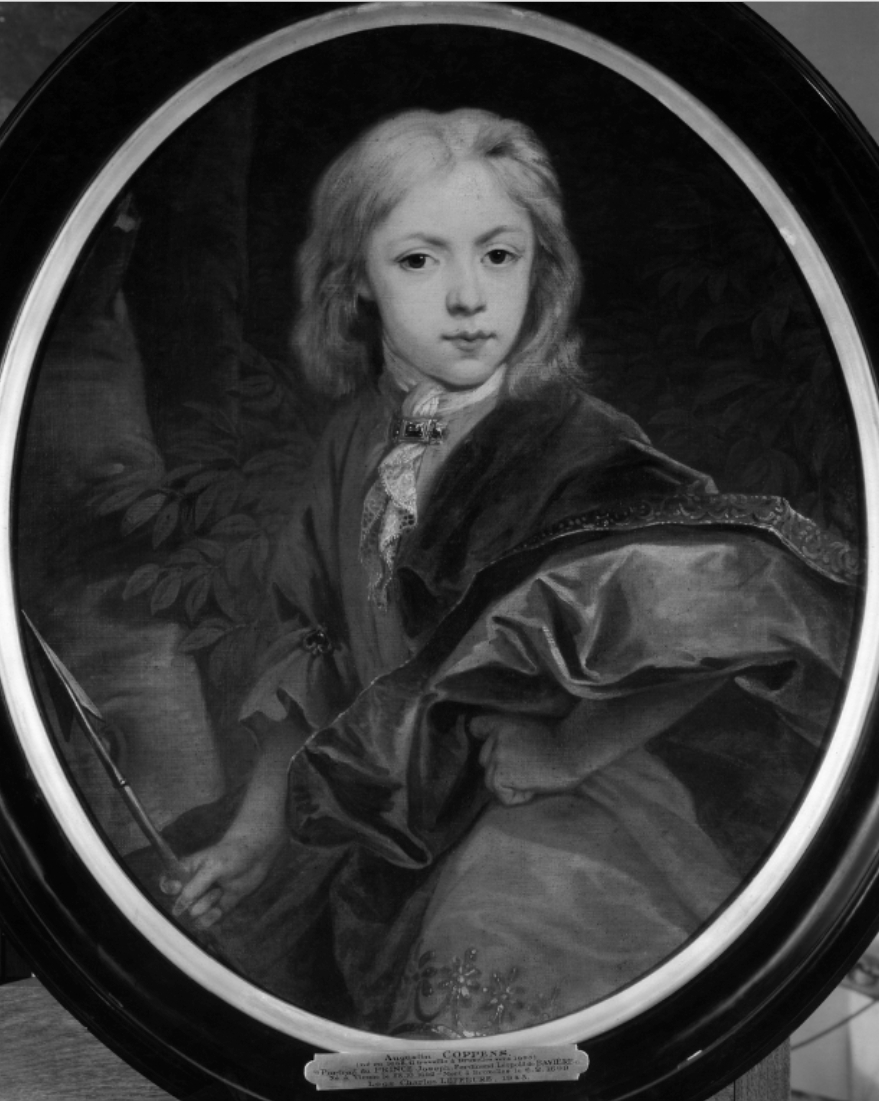
Prince Joseph Ferdinand by Augustin Coppens, 1695

Prince Joseph Ferdinand Leopold Anton Franz Kajetan Simon Thaddäus Ignaz Joachim Gabriel was born in Vienna on October 28, 1692, son of Duke Maximilian II Emanuel, Elector of Bavaria, and Archduchess Maria Antonia, daughter of Emperor Leopold I. He was a great-nephew of Charles II of Spain.

His mother died soon after his birth. He was then left in the charge of his grandfather, Holy Roman Emperor Leopold I, as his father was in Brussels, where he served as governor of the Spanish Netherlands from March 1692. On May 2, 1693, Joseph Ferdinand, accompanied by the former household of his mother, left Vienna for Munich, where he arrived on 2 or 3 June.

== Heir-presumptive of Charles II ==
Charles II of Spain suffered from ill health for most of his life and seemed likely to die childless. Because the Spanish Empire remained powerful and largely intact, the succession was of great significance to the European balance of power and a matter of debate for many years. As the only surviving descendant of Margaret Theresa and a great-grandson of Philip IV, Joseph Ferdinand's claim was sound and widely recognized in Spain. Furthermore, being neither a Habsburg nor a Bourbon, his candidacy appealed to England and the Dutch Republic due to its alignment with the emerging balance of power doctrine in Europe.

Charles II's mother, Mariana of Austria, recognized Joseph Ferdinand as rightful heir to the Spanish crown and firmly advocated for his claim. This put her at odds with her younger brother Leopold I and daughter-in-law Mariana of Neuburg: both wanted Leopold's son, the Archduke Charles, to succeed Charles II. In an attempt to limit his grandson's succession rights and strengthen the claim of his son, Emperor Leopold I had forced his daughter, Maria Antonia (the Electoral Prince's mother), to waive her inheritance rights before she died.

At the Spanish court, conflict over the succession of Charles II emerged between the two Marianas—the Queen Mother and the Consort—sparking a period of intense political tension and intrigue from 1693 to 1696, culminating in the death of the Queen Mother. The Bavarian cause, led by the Queen Mother, found numerous followers among the nobles dissatisfied with the German clique of Mariana of Neuburg. According to rumors circulated by the court, there was a plot which intended to lock up the Queen and bring Prince Joseph Ferdinand to Madrid, to be placed on the throne under the regency of the Queen Mother and her chief supporters.

The Queen Mother died on May 16, 1696. Her triumph was a posthumously signed will (explanation?) in which her son, Charles II, decreed in September 1696 his great-nephew Joseph Ferdinand of Bavaria, the heir to the monarchy. In the State Council of June 13, 1696, an intermediate position between the French and the imperial candidates for succession, in which Joseph Ferdinand was featured as the candidate best suited to the succession. In the end Charles wrote a will in which he declared the Electoral Prince, Joseph Ferdinand, to be his successor.

In September of that year Charles II had a severe relapse so the State Council resolved to force the King to sign the will in June. The King had a relapse on October 9, so that the State Council reconvened. At that meeting the Bavarian party got the will pushed through and Cardinal Portocarrero forced King Charles II to sign the testament in favor of the Electoral Prince of Bavaria: only the Admiral of Castile, the Constable and three members supported the Archduke Charles.

During the minority of Joseph Ferdinand, the regency instituted by the will appointed a governing board which supported Mariana of Austria during the minority of Charles II, headed by Cardinal Portocarrero, the Regent-Governor who would have very broad powers.

The stubborn defence of the nomination by the pro-Bavarian Cardinal Portocarrero, become a key policy of the last years of the reign of Charles II. The Cardinal prevented Charles II from succumbing to the influence of his wife and possibly summoning a Parliament to modify the testament.

In early 1698 Portocarrero presented the king with a new report of the State Council in favor of the Bavarian Succession. The monarch wanted to consult with Pope Innocent XII, who was also allegedly pro-Bavarian. It was in such circumstances that the King reaffirmed his Testament:

I declare my legitimate successor in all my kingdoms, states and dominions, the Electoral Prince Maximilian Joseph, only son of the Archduchess Maria Antonia, my niece, and Electoral Duke of Bavaria, who was also the only child of the Empress Margaret, my sister, who married the Emperor, my uncle, first the line of succession to all my kingdoms, by the will of the king, my lord and father, as claimed by the laws of those kingdoms, as has been said; the exclusion of the Queen of France my sister wherefore the said Electoral Prince Joseph Ferdinand as sole heir of this right, a man closest to me in the most immediate and direct line, is my legitimate successor in all of them ...

Mariana of Neuburg reacted against the Testament by having Catalonia seized, and German troops were sent to Toledo and Madrid, while her cousin, Prince George of Hesse-Darmstadt prepared to leave Barcelona with his troops. The French Ambassador to Madrid, Henri, duc d’Harcourt, met 6000 soldiers who had arrived in Madrid ready to intervene.

Max Emanuel of Bavaria sent for his son to come to Brussels with the intention that the States of Flanders would swear an oath on the death of Charles II. Joseph Ferdinand came to the Flemish capital on 23 May 1698. Meanwhile, Louis XIV agreed in The Hague with the maritime powers on the distribution of the Spanish Crown's lands on the death of Charles II: the First Partition Treaty was signed with England on September 8 and the United Provinces on 11 October. It provided that the peninsular kingdoms, with the exception of Guipúzcoa, plus the Indies would go to Joseph Ferdinand (section 5), the Archduke Charles would receive the Milanese (article 6), while Louis, Dauphin of France would remain in possession of the kingdoms of Naples and Sicily, as well as the State of Presidi and the Marquisate of Finale.

The Spanish refused to have their empire divided without being consulted, and on 14 November 1698, Charles II published his will making Joseph Ferdinand heir to an independent and undivided Spanish Empire.

== Death and legacy ==
Joseph Ferdinand died of typhoid fever on February 6, 1699, at the age of six, leaving the Spanish Succession uncertain again. His death was quite sudden, marked by seizures, vomiting and prolonged loss of consciousness. He was rumored to have been poisoned by his grandfather Leopold I, but nothing has been proven. He is buried in Brussels. With him the furthest line of descent possible from the marriage of Philip IV of Spain and his second wife and niece Mariana of Austria ended.

Joseph Ferdinand's death before that of Charles II, the last Habsburg king of Spain, helped to trigger the War of the Spanish Succession. If he had survived Charles, the European powers might have permitted him to accede to the throne of Spain under the terms of the First Partition Treaty.

In his biography of Charles II, John Langdon-Davies describes the impact of the prince's death:

It was as if the one iron band holding together a crumbling ruin had suddenly broken; the mystical joy gave way to very material discontent. The population which had been exalted by patriotic fantasy into a state of euphoria that bore no relation whatever to their daily experiences, now saw life as slow starvation, with bread and all other foods scarce and dear, fields without crops, frontiers without protection, existence without hope. Even when there was almost nothing to eat Spaniards could feel themselves well-fed if they could believe in their dream; once the dream vanished, all crumbled away. Jose Fernando of Bavaria had been the point around which fantasy could weave compensating patterns of national dignity, at his death the insubstantial fabric disappeared.

== See also ==
- Treaty of The Hague (1698)

== Sources ==
- Hume, Martin Andrew Sharp (1906). Queens of Old Spain. McClure, Philips & Company.
- Langdon-Davies, John (1963). Carlos: The King Who Would Not Die. Englewood Cliffs, N.J.: Prentice Hall.
- Prince of Greece, Michael (1983). Louis XIV: The Other Side of the Sun. Translated by Alan Sheridan. London: Orbis Publishing Limited. ISBN 978-0-06-015217-8.
- Spielman, John Philip (1977). Leopold I. London: Thames and Hudson. ISBN 978-0-500-87005-1.
