= Théodore-Edmond Plumier =

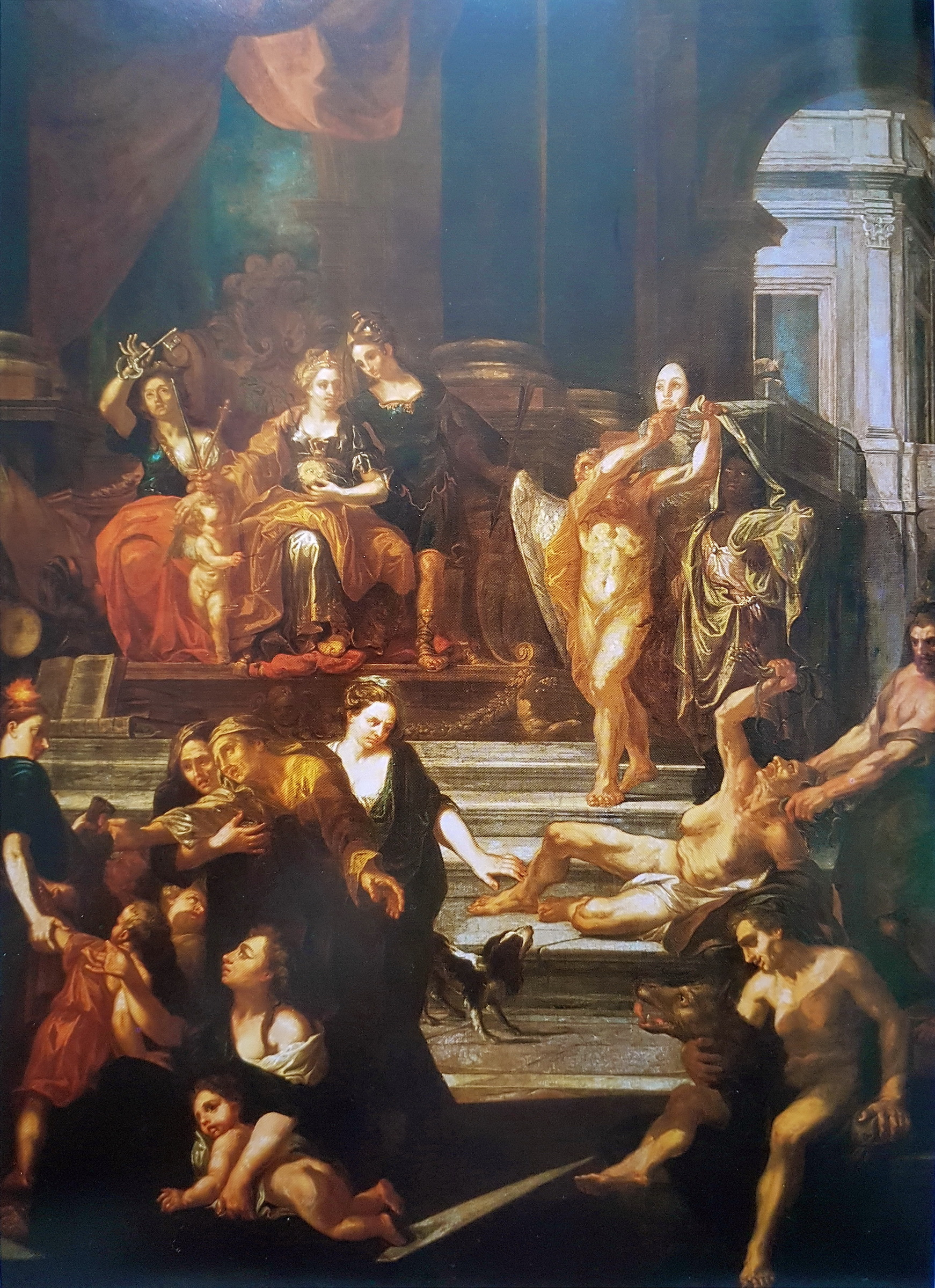
The Double Jurisdiction , 1714, chimney piece for the hôtel de ville de Maastricht

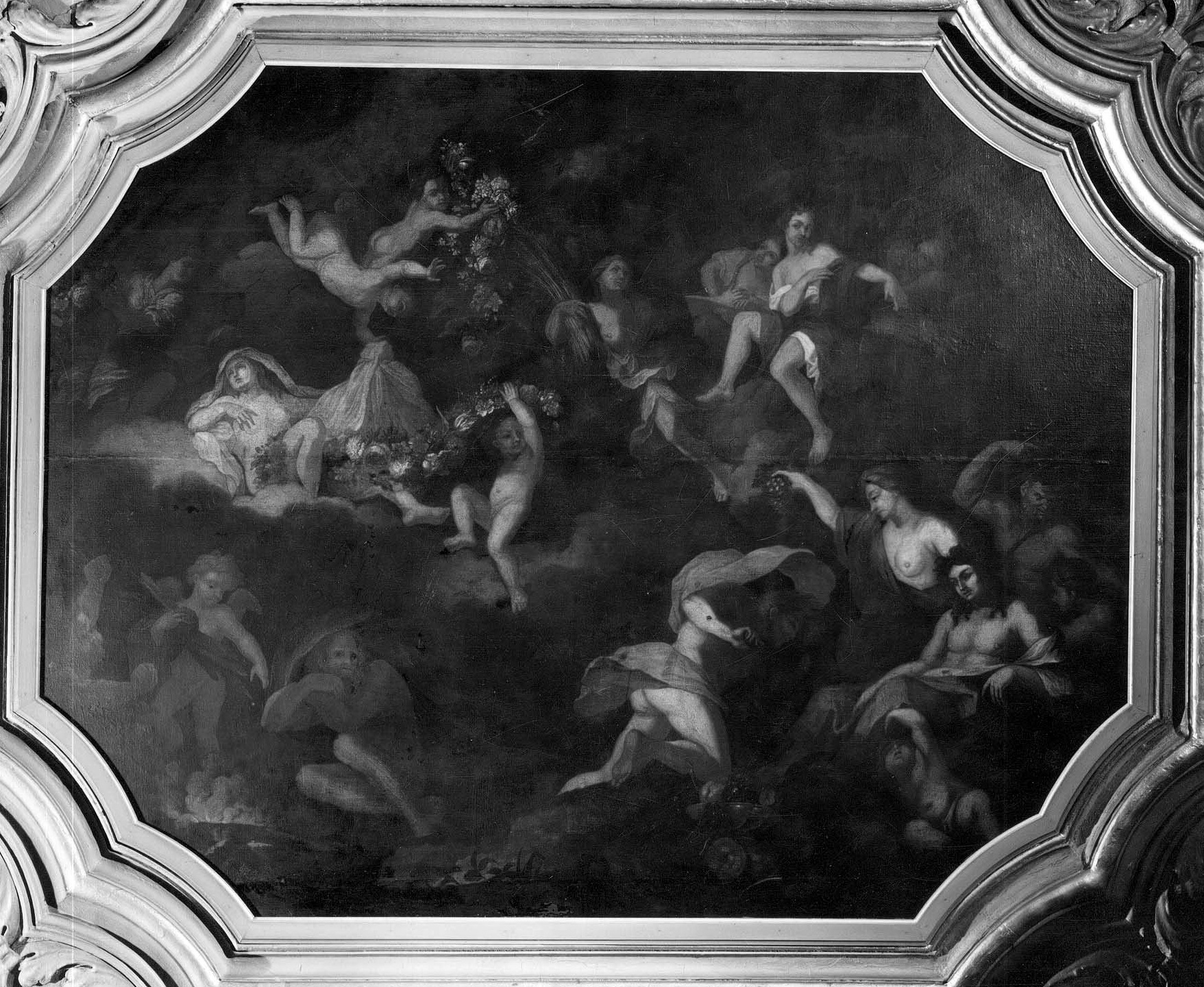
Allegory of the Four Seasons, 1720, ceiling of the hôtel de Ville, Liège

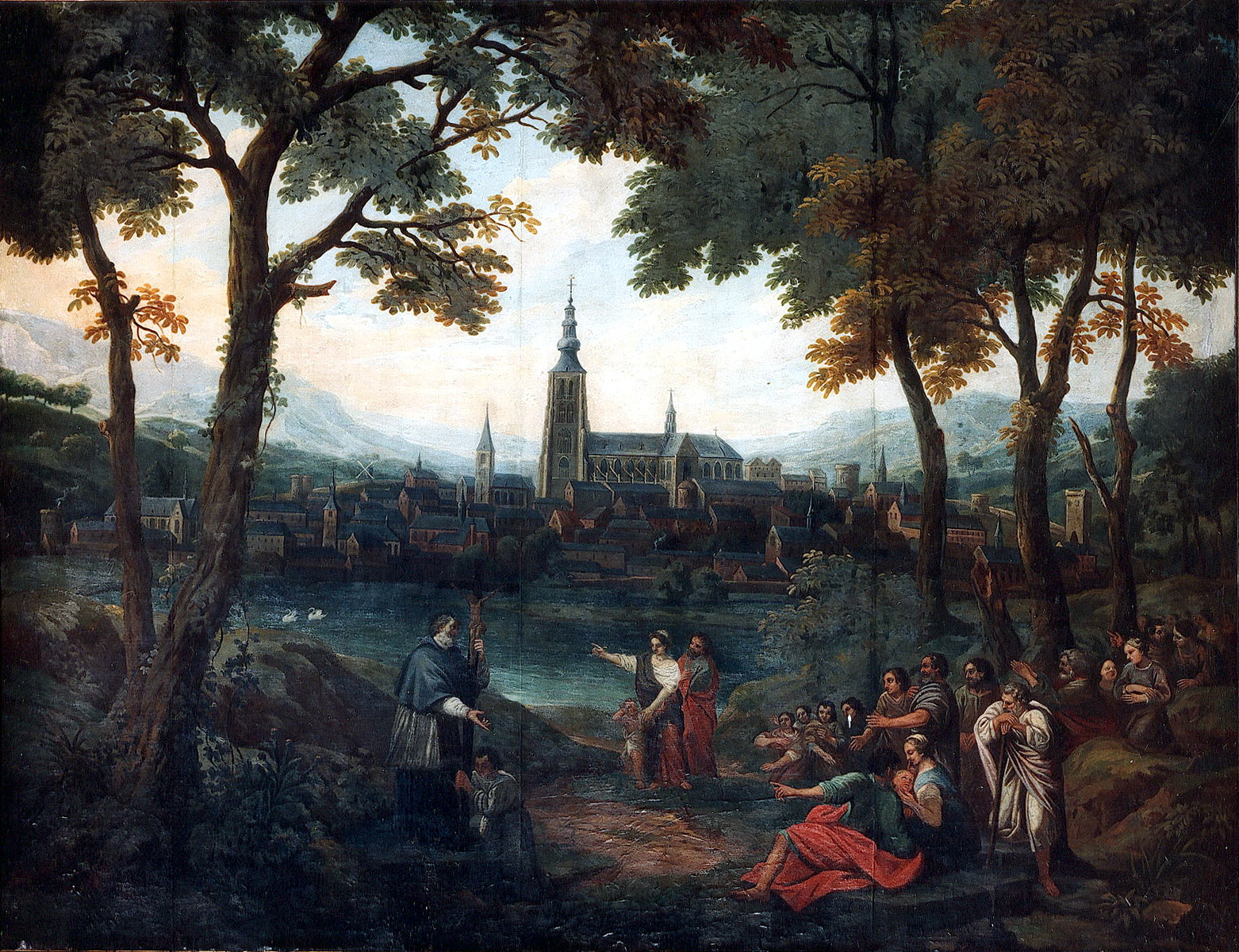
Saint Maternus Preaching at Tongres, 1722, basilique Notre-Dame de Tongres

Théodore-Edmond Plumier (8 March 1671 - 27 December 1733) was a religious, allegorical and portrait painter born in Liège. Along with Jean-Baptiste Coclers, Paul-Joseph Delcloche, Nicolas de Fassin, Léonard Defrance and Pierre-Michel de Lovinfosse, he was one of the most important Baroque painters active in the Principality of Liège.

== Life ==
Nothing is known of his youth except that he was an apprentice to Englebert Fisen, another painter in the city. He seems to have then moved to Paris, where he studied under the portraitist Nicolas de Largillierre. After his stay in France, he moved on to Rome, where he worked in Agostino Masucci's studio. He returned to the Principality sometime before 1708. There he gained several commissions, including the decoration of the hôtels de ville in Maastricht and Liège. He only definitively moved back to the city of Liège itself around 1719. He also worked for several noble families, particularly the Oultremont family. Eleven paintings by him survive in the château de Warfusée, including three of the lord and seven portraits of members of the Oultremont family.

He was also commissioned by several churches in and around the city. His Saint Benedict Taken Up To Heaven for St James's Church, Liège is considered his masterpiece. Plumier also produced the high altarpiece for Liège's churches of Saint-Remacle (Descent from the Cross) and Sainte-Catherine (Martyrdom of St Catherine)—the latter sagged and tore in July 2018 and is being restored in situ.

Plumier had two sons, who both also became painters. Jacques-Théodore (Liège, 1702–1766), painted Baptism of Clovis as the high altarpiece for the church of Saint-Rémy in Huy. Philippe-Joseph-Clément (Liège, 1718-?) is recorded in Rome between 1739 and 1743 and a beneficiary of the foundation Darchis in the studio of Agostino Masucci. Plumier himself died in his home city and is buried in the church of Saint-Nicolas Au-Trez, whilst the city's Rue Plumier is named after him.

== Paintings ==
=== Oultremont portraits ===
- Portrait of Jeanne-Olympe, countess of Oultremont, chanoinesse d'Andenne, oil on canvas, 75 × 60 cm, château de Warfusée
- Portrait of Jean-Baptiste d'Oultremont, mayor of Liège and bailiff of Moha, oil on canvas, 95 × 73 cm, 1714, château de Warfusée
- Portrait of Jean-Baptiste d'Oultremont in armour, oil on canvas, 84 × 65 cm, château de Warfusée

=== Other portraits ===
- Portrait of Prince William of Hesse, oil on canvas, 1720, musée d'Ansembourg
- Portrait of P. Klonkert, prior of Bernardfagne, 1722, seminarian of Saint-Roch, Ferrières
- Portrait of Thomas de Strickland, bishop of Namur, 1729, château de Laerne
- Portrait of Adrien-Gérard, count of Lannoy-Clervaux, 126,8 × 96,2 cm, 1729, musée des Arts décoratifs de Namur (hôtel de Groesbeeck - de Croix, Namur
- Portrait of Hubert du Château, mayor of Liege (attributed), oil on canvas, 97,8 × 76,5 cm, La Boverie, Liège
- Portrait of count Maximilien-Henri de Horion, château de Colonster
- Portrait of mayor Louis-Lambert de Liverloo, oil on canvas, 198 × 140 cm, 1733,La Boverie
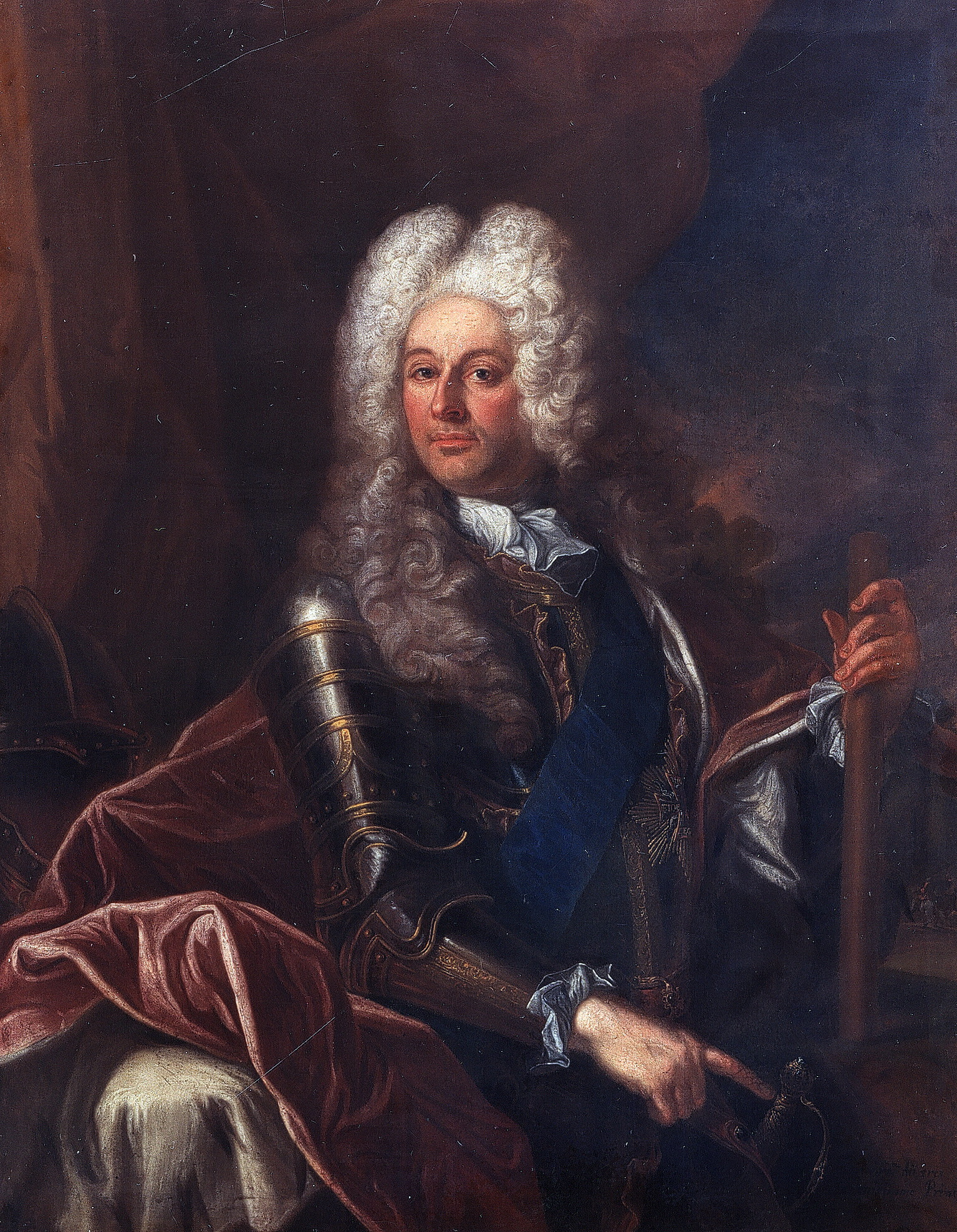
Portrait of William of Hesse

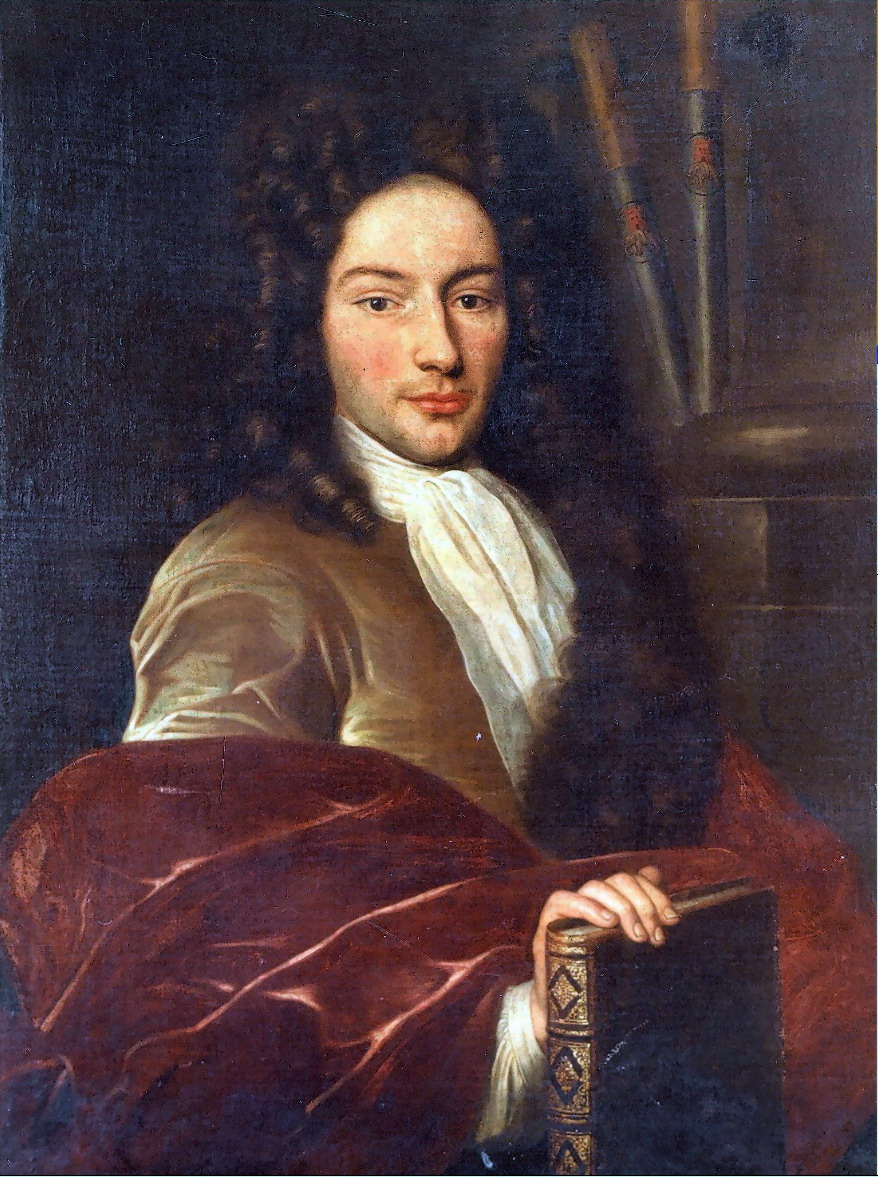
Portrait of Hubert du Château

=== Collaborations with Juppin ===
He frequently collaborated with Jean-Baptiste Juppin, with Juppin painting the landscape backgrounds and Plumier the figures. Examples are the four large-format paintings of episodes from Jesus' life in the basilique Saint-Martin de Liège and five paintings in the basilique Notre-Dame de Tongres (three of the latter are on the life of Maternus of Cologne).

- St Peter Sending Maternus, Eucharius and Valerius to Tongre, St Maternus Preaching at Tongres, The Body of St Maternus in a Boat, The Visitation of Mary to Elisabeth and The Flight into Egypt, 1722, basilique Notre-Dame de Tongres
- Decoration of the hôtel de ville de Liège, 1725
  - Chimneypiece, Allegory in memory of lord Michel-Joseph de Grady de Groenendael's election as mayor of the city of Liège, canvas, 170 × 119 cm (mayor's cabinet)
  - Allegory of Spring, 149 × 118 cm,
  - Allegory of Summer, 149 × 118 cm
  - Allegory of Autumn, 149 × 118 cm
  - Allegory of Winter, 149 × 118 cm
  - Venus and Adonis, 330 × 166 cm
  - Death of Adonis, 330 × 204 cm
  - Meeting of Diana and Venus, 330 × 252 cm
  - Adonis Received by Venus at his Birth, 330 × 166 cm

=== Other ===
- Judgement of Paris, 130× 87 cm, 1712
- Chimneypiece The Double Jurisdiction , 1714, mayor's hall, hôtel de ville de Maastricht
- Mythological Scene (Pluto and Prosperpina), 214 × 169 cm, 1717, château de Warfusée
- Allegory of the Four Seasons, 245 × 315 cm, 1720, hôtel de ville de Liège
- Allegory of the Restoration of the Magistrates in 1725, 1725, 100 × 65 cm, La Boverie, Liège
- Allegory, 168 × 117 cm, hôtel de Grady, Liège (from église Saint-Rémy in Huy)

== Drawings ==
Drawings, studies and preliminary sketches by him are in the collections of the:

- académie royale des beaux-arts de Liège
- prints and drawings department of La Boverie
  - Adoration of the Shepherds
  - Virtues and Vices (design for a ceiling)
  - Time and the Seasons
  - Symoblic Representation of the Fountain of Life (Christ on the Cross)
  - Peter Nolasco's Vision of St Peter
  - Martyrdom of St Catherine of Alexandria
  - The Virgin Interceding with the Holy Trinity for the Souls in Purgatory
  - Venus in the Forge of Vulcan
  - Portrait of the Prince-Bishop Georges-Louis de Berghes, 1728
  - Beheading of St John the Baptist
  - Two Heads of Bearded Men
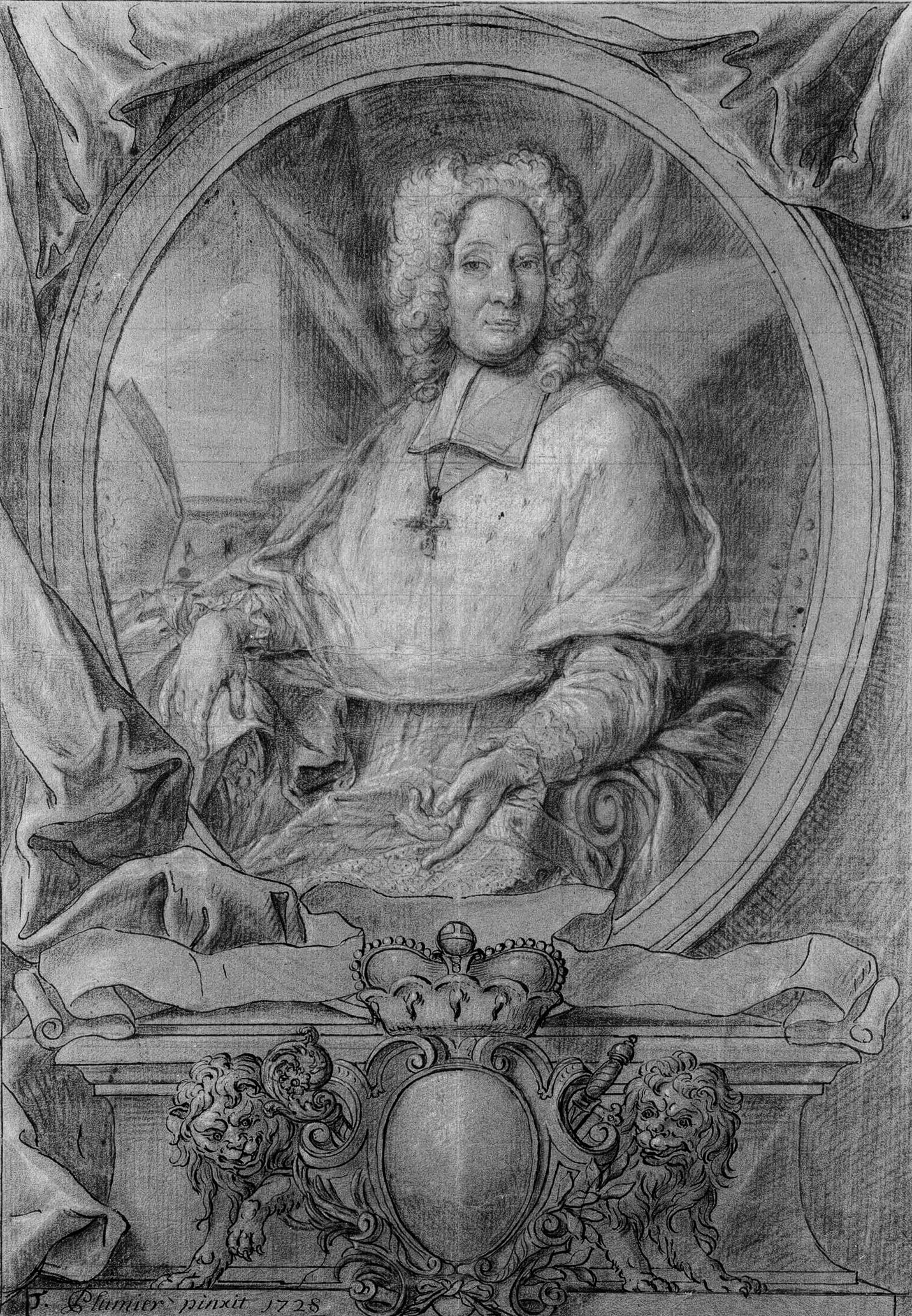
Portrait of Georges-Louis de Berghes

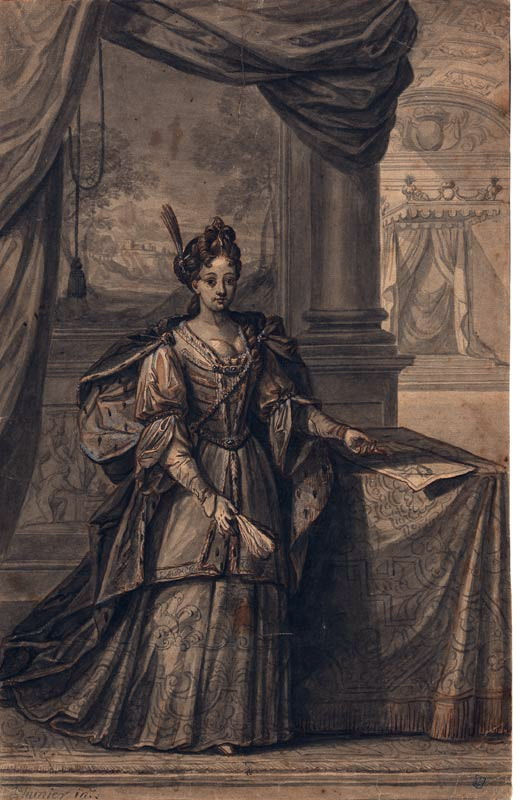
Drawing of a woman

== Bibliography (in French) ==
- Jules Helbig, La peinture au pays de Liége et sur les bords de la Meuse, Liège, Henri Poncelet, 1903 (1re éd. 1873), 509 p. (lire en ligne [archive]), chap. XVI (« Edmon Plumier, Nicolas La Fabrique, Olivier Pirotte »), p. 369-376
- Jules Helbig, « PLUMIER (Edmond) », dans Biographie Nationale, t. XVII, Bruxelles, Académie royale des sciences, des lettres et des beaux-arts de Belgique, 1903 (ISSN 0770-7150, lire en ligne [archive]), p. 825-829
- Le Siècle des Lumières dans la Principauté de Liège (catalogue d'exposition), Liège, Musée de l'Art wallon, 1980, 417 p., p. 182-183
