= Lovinfosse =

Lovinfosse is a surname. Notable people with the surname include:

- Lola Lovinfosse (born 2005), French racing driver
- Pierre-Michel de Lovinfosse (1747–1821), Belgian painter
