= Warnant-Dreye =

Section of Villers-le-Bouillet, Wallonia, Belgium

Coordinates: 50°36′N 5°14′E

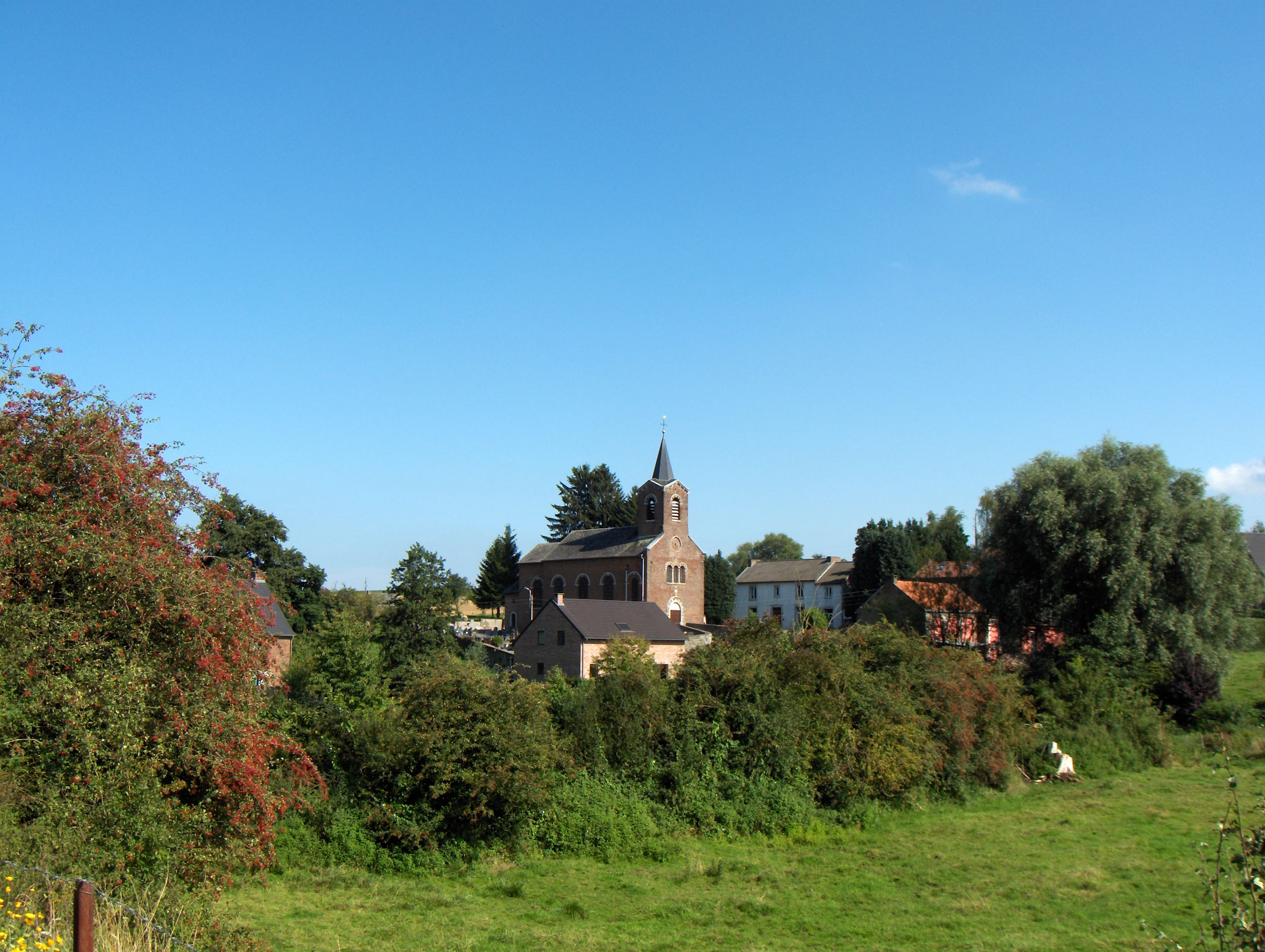
View of Dreye Village

Warnant-Dreye (Walloon: Wernant) is a village of Wallonia and a district of the municipality of Villers-le-Bouillet, located in the province of Liège, Belgium. Its post code is 4530. It should not be confused with the Warnant located in the province of Namur.

== History ==
The region was settled by the Franks as early as the 4th century. Merovingian tombs have been found in Warnant and surrounding villages north of Huy.

The first mention of Warnant goes back to the 11th century, with a knight named Sebastian of Warnant.

The Counts of Oultremont, one of Belgium's oldest noble families, originated in Warnant. Their oldest ancestor in direct line is Otto of Warnant, who at the end of the 13th century was lord of Warnant and Moha.

In 1266, Otto cedes all his goods in Warnant to the Abbey of Floreffe. The Premonstratensian monks would henceforth be present in Warnant, notably at the so-called Abbey's Farm. They would also serve the two churches in the village, St. Remi and St. John the Baptist. The two churches were merged by the Bishop of Liège in 1451. St. John the Baptist's Church was demolished in the 16th century, but the other one is still standing nowadays.

The first castle of Warnant, a fortified dungeon facing St. Remi's Church, was destroyed under the rule of Otto I in 1276, in the heat of the War of the Cow, which ravaged the Principality of Liège and the County of Namur between 1275 and 1278.

After Otto I, the House of Warnant would split in several branches, including the La Neuville, Ladrier, Oultremont, Saint-Jean, Fumal, Vaux, etc. The family thus controlled most of the hamlets in the area, and provided many Bailiff of Moha, Grand Bailiff of Hesbaye, Alderman of Huy and Liège.

The branches of La Neuville-en-Condroz and Oultremont would later become Barons. In 1731, Jean-François-Paul-Emile d'Oultremont was elevated to the rank of Count of the Holy Roman Empire. One of his children, Charles-Nicolas d'Oultremont would be elected Prince-Bishop of Liège in 1763. The Warnant/Oultremont family is the only surviving Belgian family which has counted a Prince-Bishop of Liège amongst its members.

In 1823, the villages of Warnant and Dreye were merged to form the municipality of Warnant-Dreye, which in turn was added to Villers-le-Bouillet as a sub-municipality in the municipal reorganization of 1977.
