= Jean-Baptiste d'Oultremont =

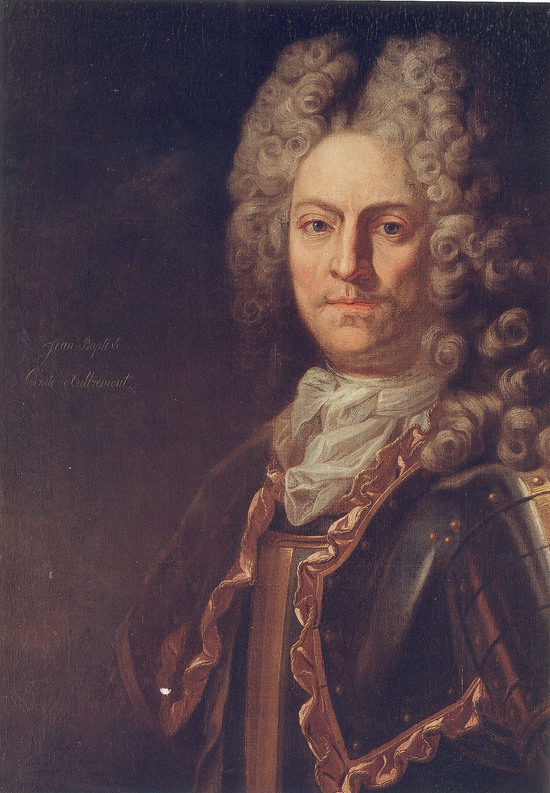

Jean-Baptiste-François d'Oultremont (28 April 1672 – 8 May 1735), seigneur de Lamine, was grand-bailiff of Moha and mayor of Liège in 1711.

== Life ==
Born at the château d'Oultremont in Warnant-Dreye, he was the son of Jean-Baptiste d'Oultremont, canon of the church of Notre-Dame in Huy and later baron de Han-sur-Lesse, seigneur de Laminne, de Chevelogne, d'Oultremont and peer of the duchy of Luxembourg. His mother was Marie-Jacqueline de Berlaymont, dame de Thiribu. He died without issue at his younger brother's residence of the château de Warfusée.

== Bibliography ==
- (in French) Baron Isidore de Stein d'Altenstein, Annuaire de la noblesse de Belgique, 1861, page 242.
- (in French) Le Siècle des Lumières dans la Principauté de Liège : [exposition], Musée de l’art wallon et de l’évolution culturelle de la Wallonie, octobre-novembre-décembre 1980, Liège, [Le Musée, 1980], p. 183.
- (in French) Généalogie succincte de la Maison d'Oultremont, extrait de l'historien Maurice Yans, pp.70 et 71, 1990, Warfusée, Saint-Georges D/CEO/Editeur
