= Pierre-Michel de Lovinfosse =

Painter from Liège (1747–1821)

Pierre-Michel de Lovinfosse (2 November 1747 – 10 December 1821) was a painter from Liège, present-day Belgium.

He was born and died in Liège and – with Théodore-Edmond Plumier, Jean-Baptiste Coclers, Nicolas Henri Joseph de Fassin, Léonard Defrance, and Paul-Joseph Delcloche – was one of the main Baroque and Rococo painters in the Principality of Liège.

He married Marie-Élisabeth Dodémont, a colour merchant and widow of the flower painter Dieudonné Deneux. He was also a nephew of the painter Paul-Joseph Delcloche.
