= Vieux-Waleffe =

Section of Villers-le-Bouillet, Wallonia, Belgium

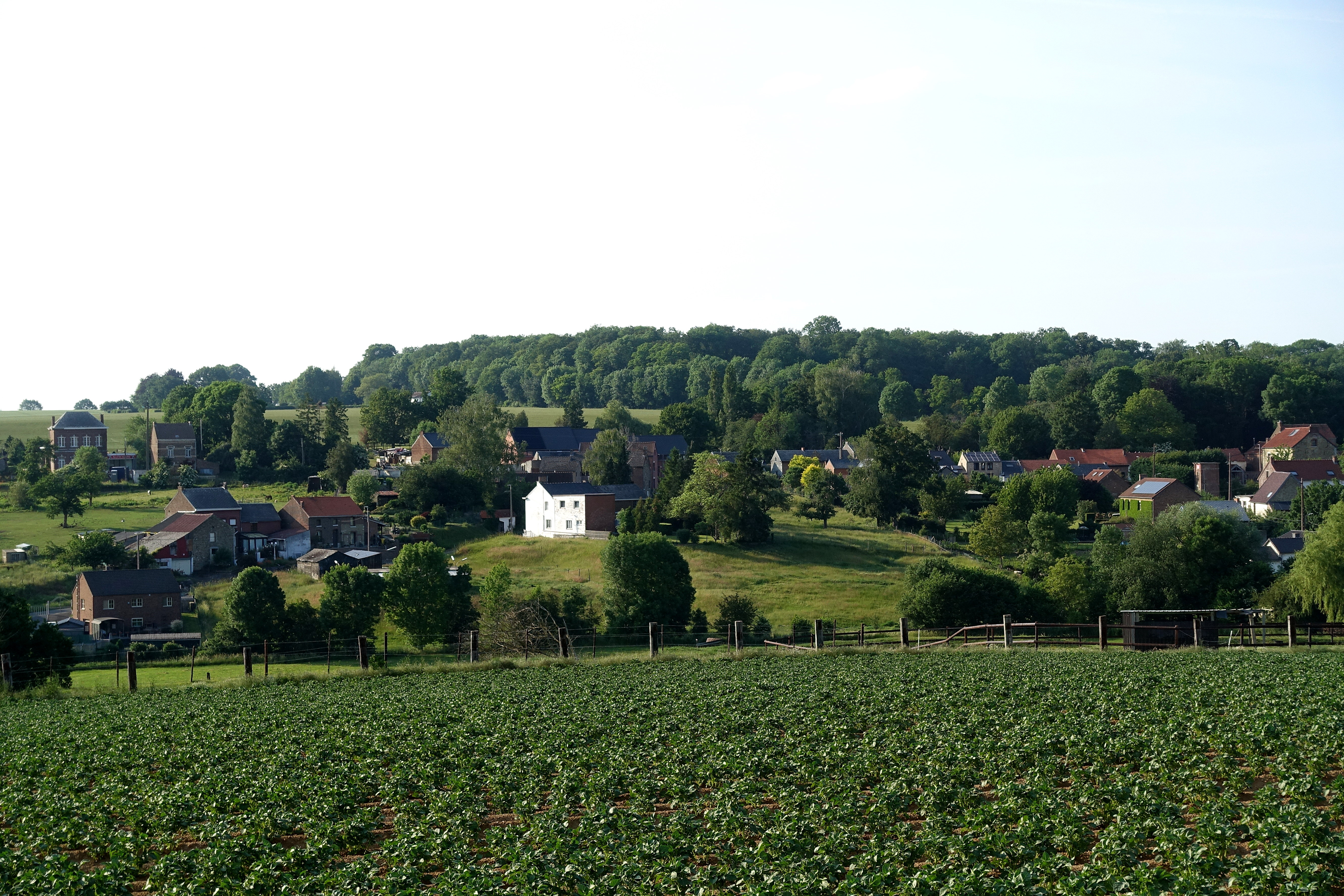
- Vieux-Waleffe

- Location within Belgium Location within Europe
- Coordinates: 50°37′N 05°12′E
- Country: Belgium
- Region: Wallonia
- Province: Liège
- Municipality: Villers-le-Bouillet

Vieux-Waleffe (French pronunciation: [vjø walɛf], lit. 'Old Waleffe') is a village and district of the municipality of Villers-le-Bouillet, located in the province of Liège in Wallonia, Belgium.

The village, located on a site inhabited since the Neolithic, was mentioned in written sources for the first time in 1050. The village developed around a castle; there was also a chapel in the village during the Middle Ages. The current village church dates from 1872, and is in a Romanesque Revival style, designed by J.-L. Blandot. There are several historical buildings in the village.
