= List of protected heritage sites in Villers-le-Bouillet =

This table shows an overview of the protected heritage sites in the Walloon town Villers-le-Bouillet. This list is part of Belgium's national heritage.

Object	Year/architect	Town/section	Address	Coordinates	Number^{?}	Image
elm tree called la Bourlotte and three oak trees ^{(nl)} ^{(fr)}		Villers-le-Bouillet		50.601844°N 5.251047°E	61068-CLT-0003-01 Info	
Tumulus of Vaux, the tumulus and surroundings ^{(nl)} ^{(fr)}		Villers-le-Bouillet	rue Les Waleffes	50.620868°N 5.230152°E	61068-CLT-0004-01 Info	Tumulus van Vaux, de tumulus en omgeving
Tumulus of Oultremont ^{(nl)} ^{(fr)}		Villers-le-Bouillet	rue Roua	50.583880°N 5.219460°E	61068-CLT-0007-01 Info	Tumulus van Oultremont
Tumulus of Vaux, the archeological site ^{(nl)} ^{(fr)}		Villers-le-Bouillet		50.620868°N 5.230152°E	61068-PEX-0001-01 Info	Tumulus van Vaux, de archeologische site
Tumulus of Oultremont, the archeological site ^{(nl)} ^{(fr)}		Villers-le-Bouillet		50.583880°N 5.219460°E	61068-PEX-0002-01 Info	Tumulus van Oultremont, de archeologische site

== See also ==
- List of protected heritage sites in Liège (province)
- Villers-le-Bouillet
