= Hubert du Château =

Belgian politician

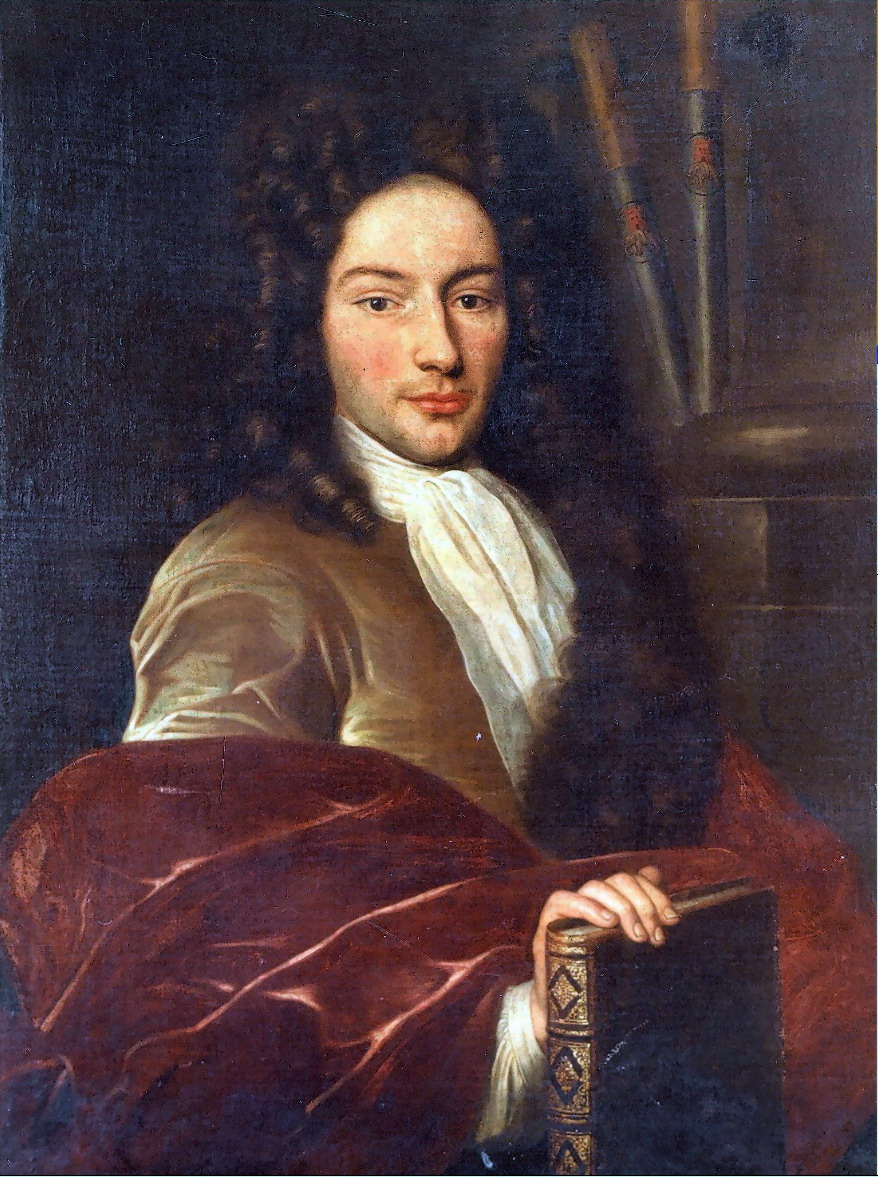
Portrait of him, attributed to Théodore-Edmond Plumier.

Hubert du Château was a lawyer and politician from Liège and served as the city's mayor in 1716 with Gilles-Bernard de Stier and in 1724 with Henri de Bailly. He was also president of the 'tribunal des XXII', advisor to Charles VI, Holy Roman Emperor and permanent counsellor of the city of Liège.

== Bibliography ==
- (in French) Jean Christian Ophoven, Continuation du Recueil héraldique des Seigneurs bourgmestres de Liége, S. Bourguignon, 1783, p. 21-22
- (in French) Le Siècle des Lumières dans la Principauté de Liège (catalogue d'exposition), Liège, Musée de l'Art wallon, 1980, 417 p., p. 183
