= Villers-le-Bouillet =

Municipality in Liège Province, Wallonia, Belgium

Villers-le-Bouillet Viyé-l'-Boulet (Walloon)
- Municipality
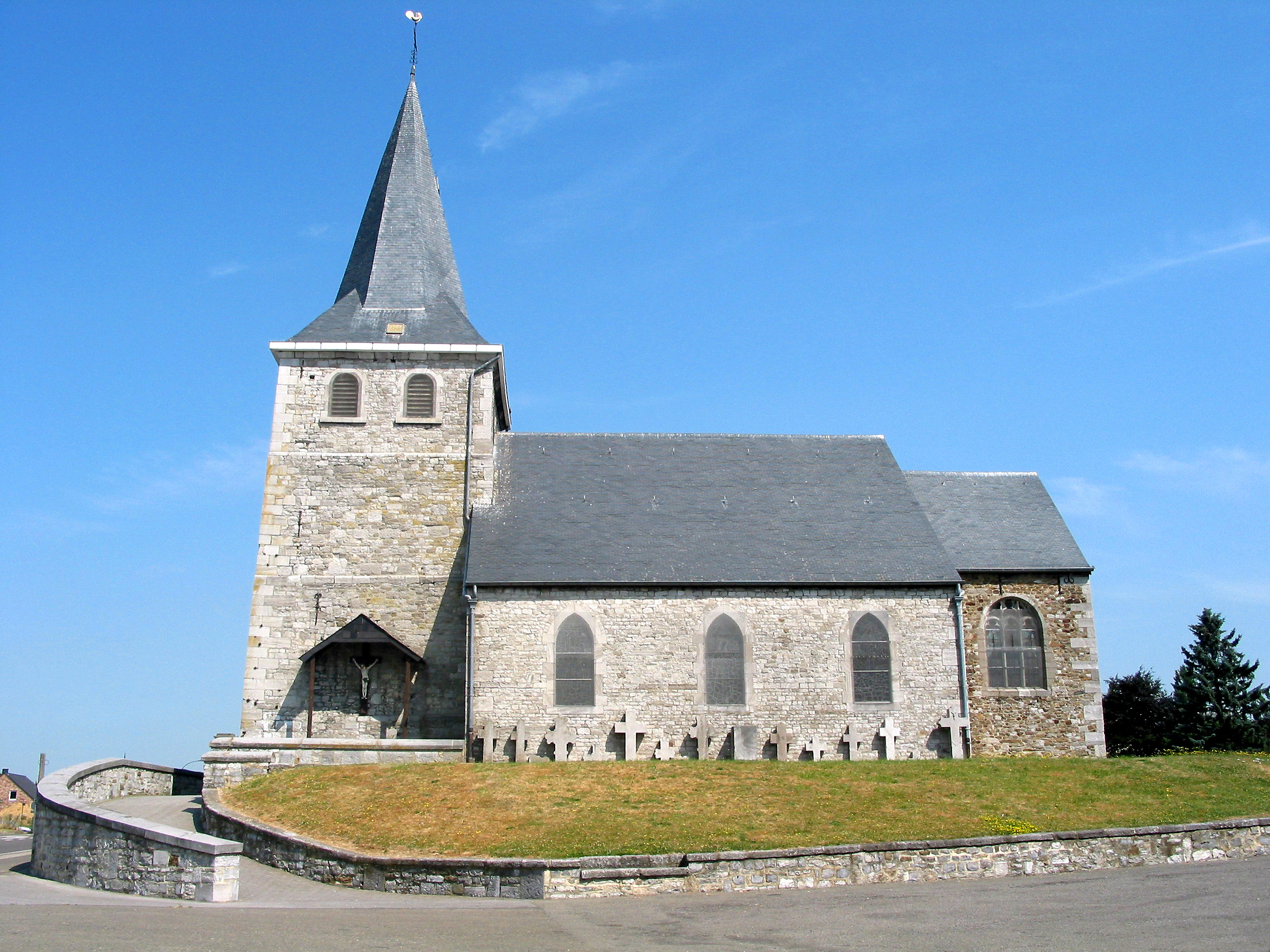

- Flag Coat of arms

- Location of Villers-le-Bouillet in the province of Liège
- Interactive map of Villers-le-Bouillet
- Location in Belgium
- Coordinates: 50°35′N 05°16′E
- Country: Belgium
- Community: French Community
- Region: Wallonia
- Province: Liège
- Arrondissement: Huy

Government
  - Mayor: François Wautelet (MR)
  - Governing parties: Videm, Ecolo, GénérationS 4530

Area
  - Total: 32.86 km^{2} (12.69 sq mi)

Population (2018-01-01)
  - Total: 6,503
  - Density: 197.9/km^{2} (512.6/sq mi)
- Postal codes: 4530
- NIS code: 61068
- Area codes: 085
- Website: www.villers-le-bouillet.be

Villers-le-Bouillet (French pronunciation: [vilɛʁs lə bujɛ]; Walloon: Viyé-l'-Boulet) is a municipality of Wallonia located in the province of Liège, Belgium.

On January 1, 2006, Villers-le-Bouillet had a total population of 6,051. The total area is 32.71 km^{2} (12.63 sq mi) which gives a population density of 185 inhabitants/km^{2} (480 inhabitants/sq mi).

The municipality consists of the following districts: Fize-Fontaine, Vaux-et-Borset, Vieux-Waleffe, Villers-le-Bouillet, and Warnant-Dreye.

In 1982–1988, it was the first Belgian municipality with a Black alderman (échevin), Donat Ajanohun, born in Benin in 1948.

== See also ==
- List of protected heritage sites in Villers-le-Bouillet
