= Maastricht City Hall =

Coordinates: 50°51′05″N 5°41′29″E

Stadshuis
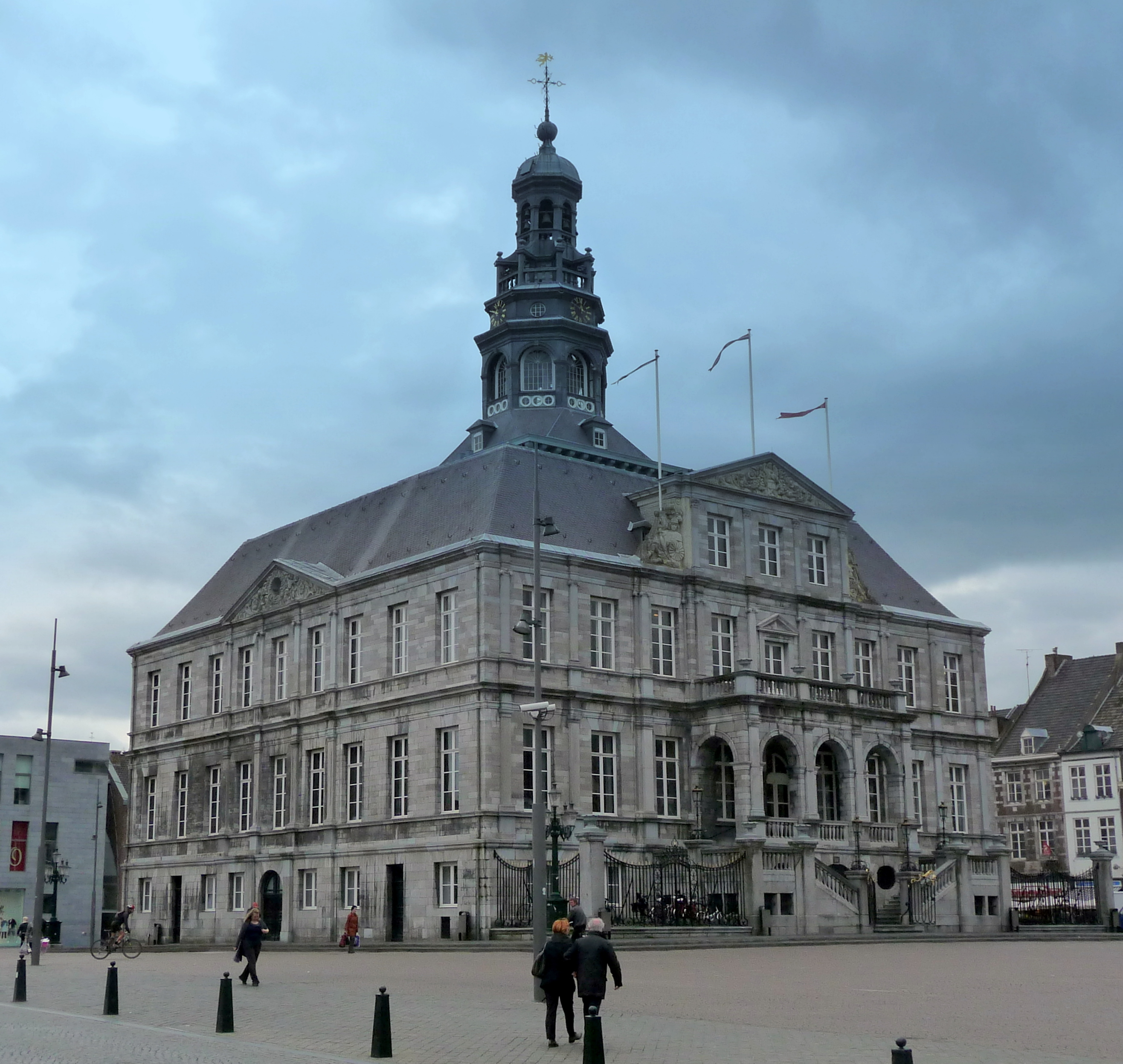
- Interactive map of the Stadshuis area

General information
- Type: city hall
- Architectural style: Dutch classicism
- Location: Markt, Maastricht, The Netherlands
- Construction started: 1659
- Construction stopped: 1684
- Opened: 1664

Height
- Height: 47m
- Roof: 23.5m

Design and construction
- Architect: Pieter Post

The Stadhuis is the historic town hall in the centre of Maastricht in the Netherlands. It is sited on the Markt square, an open-air marketplace. The building was designed by the Dutch Gold Age architect and painter Pieter Post in the 17th century in the style of Dutch classicism. The interior is mostly still from the 17th century.

== History ==
Before the construction of the town hall, the municipal council of Maastricht would gather in two other buildings at the former Sint-Jorisstraat (Grote Staat). The urban high jurisprudence took place at the nearby Dinghuis at the end of the Kleine Staat. On rare occasions the Cloth hall on the Markt would be used by the city council.

Because of the Condominium of Maastricht the governance and jurisdiction of the city was a matter of both the Duchy of Brabant and the Prince-Bishopric of Liège as early as the 13th century. From the Capture of Maastricht by Frederick Henry, Prince of Orange in 1632 the States General of the Netherlands (1464–1796) took over those rights of the Duchy of Brabant.

=== Construction of the town hall ===
There had been plans for a new town hall on the Markt in the late 16th century but because of the Eighty Years' War these did not come to fruition. In 1655 the city council gave the task of the construction to Pieter Post, the apprentice of Jacob van Campen, an architect of great renown and designer of the palaces of the House of Orange-Nassau. The choice of the in North Holland born Pieter Post as architect can be seen as sign of the increasing influence of the States General of the Netherlands in Maastricht. The decision was made to place the new town hall in the centre of the Markt this was against the wishes of the Prince-Bishopric of Liège. For this plan two houses as well as the Cloth hall, the Belfry and a part of the city wall including two of its gates had to be demolished. Because of these alterations to the Markt it gained an almost squared shape, but because of the refusal of the Prince-Bishopric of Liège to take down the two houses the site had to be moved.

Construction finally started in 1659 commemorated by the laying of the first stone by representatives of both sides of the condominium, they also buried a lead canister with coins and a copper commemorative plaque at the south-west corner of the building. After a few changes made by Cornelis Pesser, the master builder put in charge by Pieter Post, and some delays the municipal council moved in during 1664.

== Exterior ==
=== Tower ===
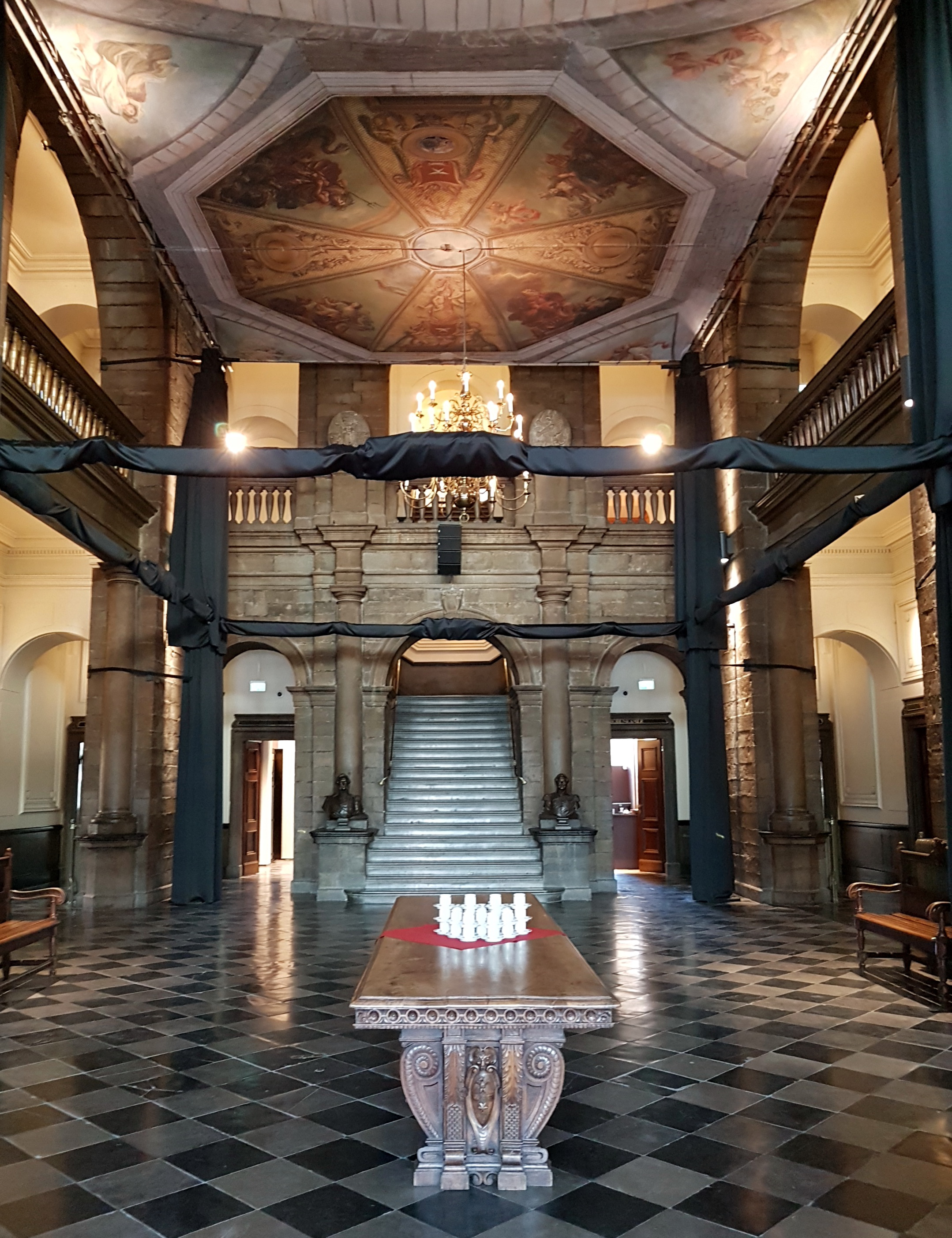
The Mainhall

The five story town hall (including the basement and loft) is finished with a sloped roof made out of slate from which a 25 meter high tower arises. The base of the tower is square but transforms into an octagonal bell tower and finishes with an open roof lantern and dome. The octagonal bell tower is made up of four increasingly smaller floors with on top a Carillon. The roof lantern is cover with a point tipped dome clad in zinc and finished with a sphere and a Weather vane.

An almost exact copy of the tower of the town hall of Maastricht can be found at the Trinity Lavra of St. Sergius near Moscow as the so-called Ducktower. This stems from the time when Peter the Great visited most of western Europe, including Maastricht, and took all that he had gathered back with him to Russia. He led a cultural revolution that replaced some of the traditionalist and medieval social and political systems with ones that were modern, scientific, Westernised and based on the Enlightenment.

== See also ==
- 17th-century Western domes

== Bibliography (in Dutch) ==
- J. van den Boogard et S. Minis, Monumentengids Maastricht, Leidee, 2001
- S. Minis et A. de Heer, Een seer magnifick Stadthuys. Tien studies over de bouw en de inrichting van het stadhuis te Maastricht, Delft, 1985
- K. Ottenheym, « L'hôtel de ville de Maastricht par Pieter Post », dans S. Minis et A. de Heer, Een seer magnifick Stadthuys. Tien studies over de bouw en de inrichting van het stadhuis te Maastricht, Delft, 1985
- L. Minis, Het Stadhuis, Maastrichts Silhouet 4, Maastricht, 1980
- E. van Nispen tot Sevenaer, De monumenten in de gemeente Maastricht, deel 1, Arnhem, 1974
