= Dinghuis =

Government building in Maastricht

Coordinates: 50°51′00″N 5°41′34″E

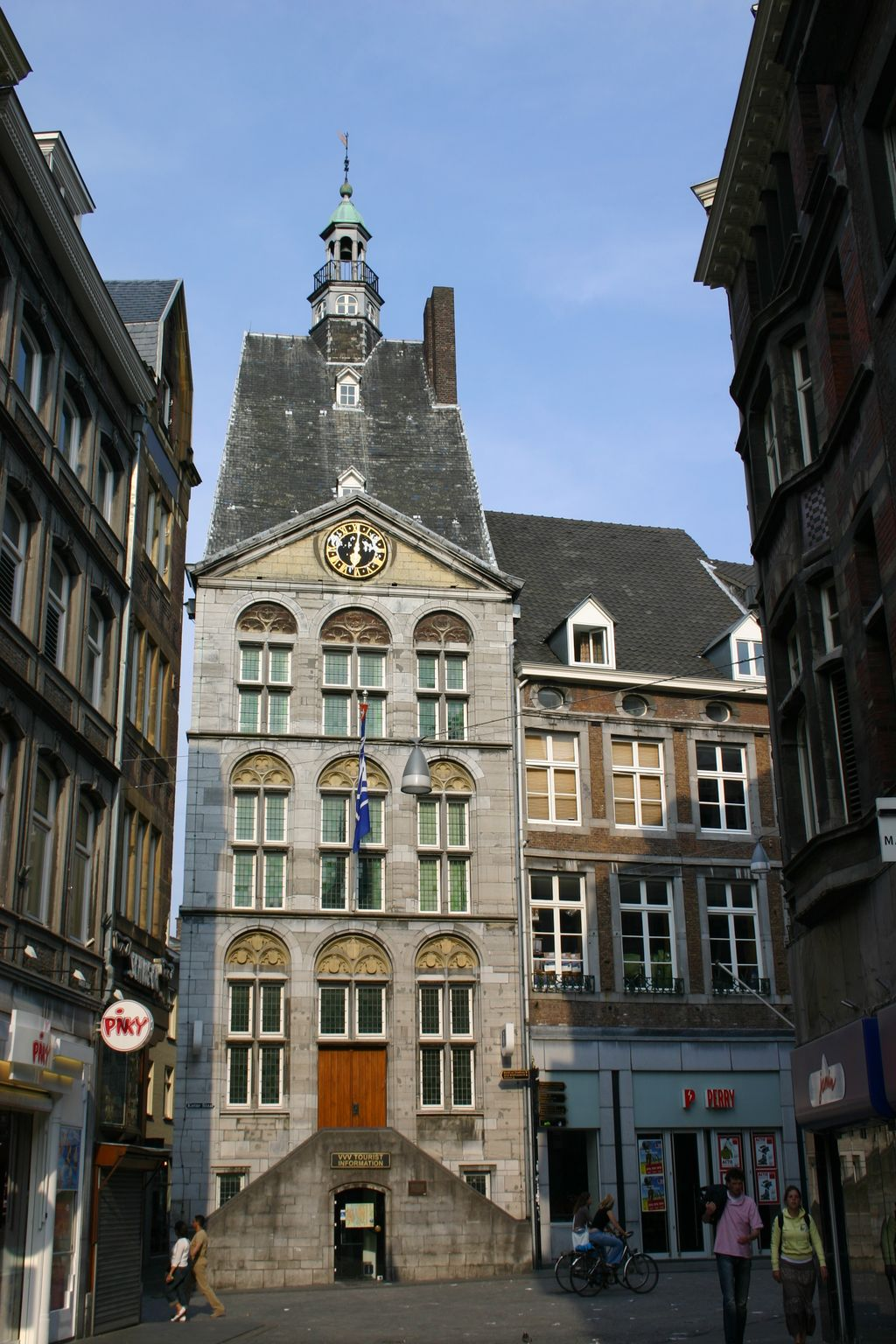
The Dinghuis

The Dinghuis (Ding House) is a building in downtown Maastricht, Netherlands, constructed at the end of the 15th century. (Ding is the Dutch name for the governing assembly known in most Germanic languages as a thing.)

The building was constructed in the gothic style of architecture. The northern façade, built around 1470, is timber-framed, and the main façade, built of Namur stone, has a pediment containing a grand clock face. At the top of the steeply sloped roof is a tower that was once used as a lookout.

The Dinghuis served mainly administrative and judicial functions (a ding/thing being a judicial assembly), and its cellars contained gaols for holding prisoners. In 1713, the Dinghuis also served as a theater. Today, it is home to the town's visitor center.
