= Dieudonné Deneux =

Jean Dieudonné Deneux (bef. 1749 – 1786) was a painter from Liège, current Belgium. He is most notable for his flower paintings.

Deneux's father, Henri Deneux, apprenticed Dieudonné to the atelier of "Coclers" (probably Jean-Georges-Christian Coclers) for three years on 15 August 1749.
