= Charles-Nicolas d'Oultremont =

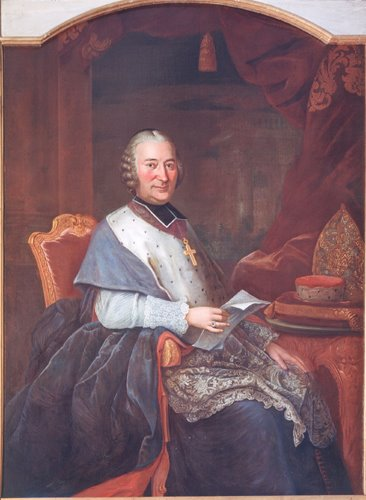
Charles-Nicolas d'Oultremont

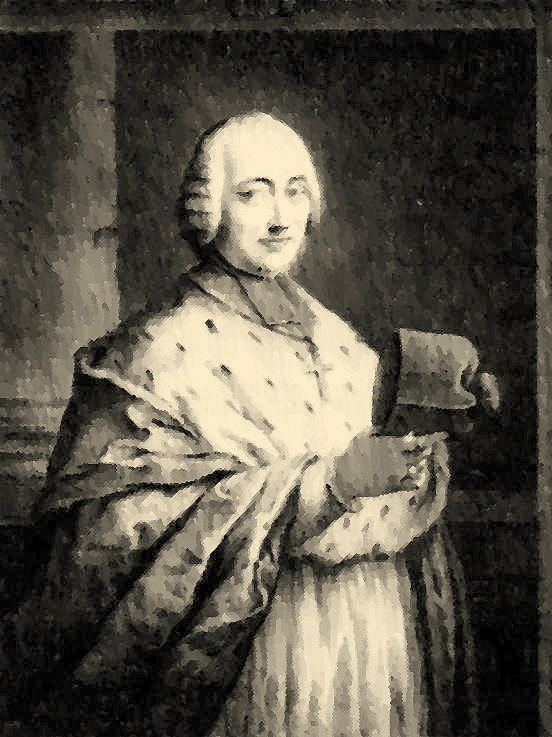
A younger d'Oultremont

Charles-Nicolas-Alexandre d'Oultremont (26 June 1716 – 22 October 1771) was Prince-Bishop of Liège from 20 April 1763 to his death in 1771. He was the eighth child of Jean-François-Paul-Emile, Count of Oultremont and of the Holy Roman Empire, and Marie-Isabelle of Bavaria, Countess of Warfusée and Druynen and Baroness of Schagen. He was born, lived and died in the castle of Warfusée (now within the municipality of Saint-Georges-sur-Meuse).

Charles of Oultremont studied at the college of Reims and at Louis-le-Grand in Paris. He was nominated Canon of the Cathedral of Liège by the Pope in 1733. He was ordained Deacon on 22 April 1764, and priest two days later.

Upon the death of Prince-Bishop Jean-Théodore of Bavaria in January 1763, Prince Clemens of Saxony, ninth child of the King of Poland, Frederick Augustus III, applied to become the next prince-bishop. His young age (only 24), however, disqualified him. In addition, he was not yet a priest and did not belong to the chapter of the cathedral. He wrote to Pope Clement XIII, who grant him eligibility. Clemens received the support from France and Austria, but not from canon priests of Liège, who preferred a local, namely Count Charles of Oultremont. The latter was elected on 20 April 1763, with 30 votes to 19.

Prince Clemens protested and appealed to the Pope and the Emperor. Emperor Francis I intervened in favour of his protégé, but the Pope confirmed the election, and Charles took his office as prince-bishop on 8 April 1764. He was consecrated at the Cathedral of Saint Lambert of Liège on 30 May. The new prince vowed to protect the authority and independence of the territory against the government of the Netherlands, the Abbot of Sint-Truiden and the Abbess-Princess of Munsterbilzen.

The reign of Charles of Oultremont was marked more by his ecclesiastical achievements than his political ones. He fought against Jansenism, against Febronianism, and against immoral writings which came flooding from France. He created new charitable institutions and enhanced the level of theological studies.

Politically, he was frequently in dispute with the Austrian Netherlands, who had supported Prince Clemens. He executed numerous works to improve trade, industry and agriculture, and ordered the paving of roads towards France, other German states and the United Provinces.

Charles of Oultremont also encountered problems with the Teutonic Order, who claimed to be exempt of taxation in virtue of their privileges.

Influenced by his brother, he also raised the quarters of nobility from eight to sixteen to be admitted into the council of the nobility. This effectively reduced the total number of noble families to around 15.

Catholic Church titles
Preceded by John Theodore of Bavaria	Prince-Bishop of Liège; 1763–1771	Succeeded by François-Charles de Velbrück
