= Hôtel de Ville, Liège =

Town hall of Liège, Belgium

Hôtel de Ville
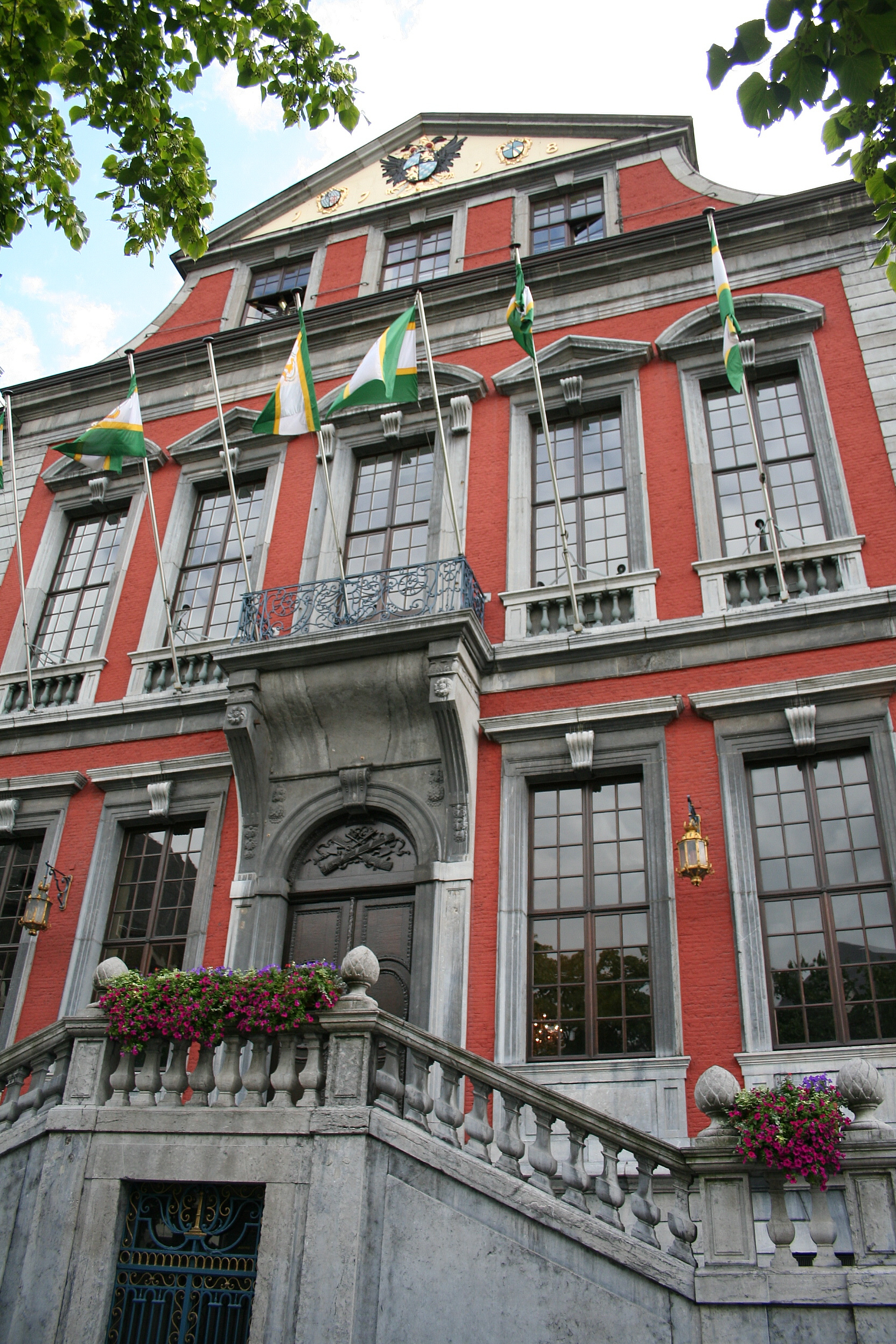
- Hôtel de Ville, Liège
- Interactive map of the Hôtel de Ville area

General information
- Architectural style: Mosan Baroque
- Location: Liège, Belgium
- Coordinates: 50°38′43″N 5°34′32″E
- Completed: 1714

The Hôtel de Ville (French pronunciation: [otɛl də vil], City Hall), also known as La Violette, is the town hall of Liège, Belgium. It is located on the Place du Marché, close to the Place Saint-Lambert, in the city centre. Built in 1714 in the Mosan Baroque style, it has a very rich interior and has been listed as 'exceptional heritage of Wallonia' since 2002.
