= Basilica of Our Lady of Tongre =

Minor Basilica of Our Lady of Tongre Notre Dame du Tongre
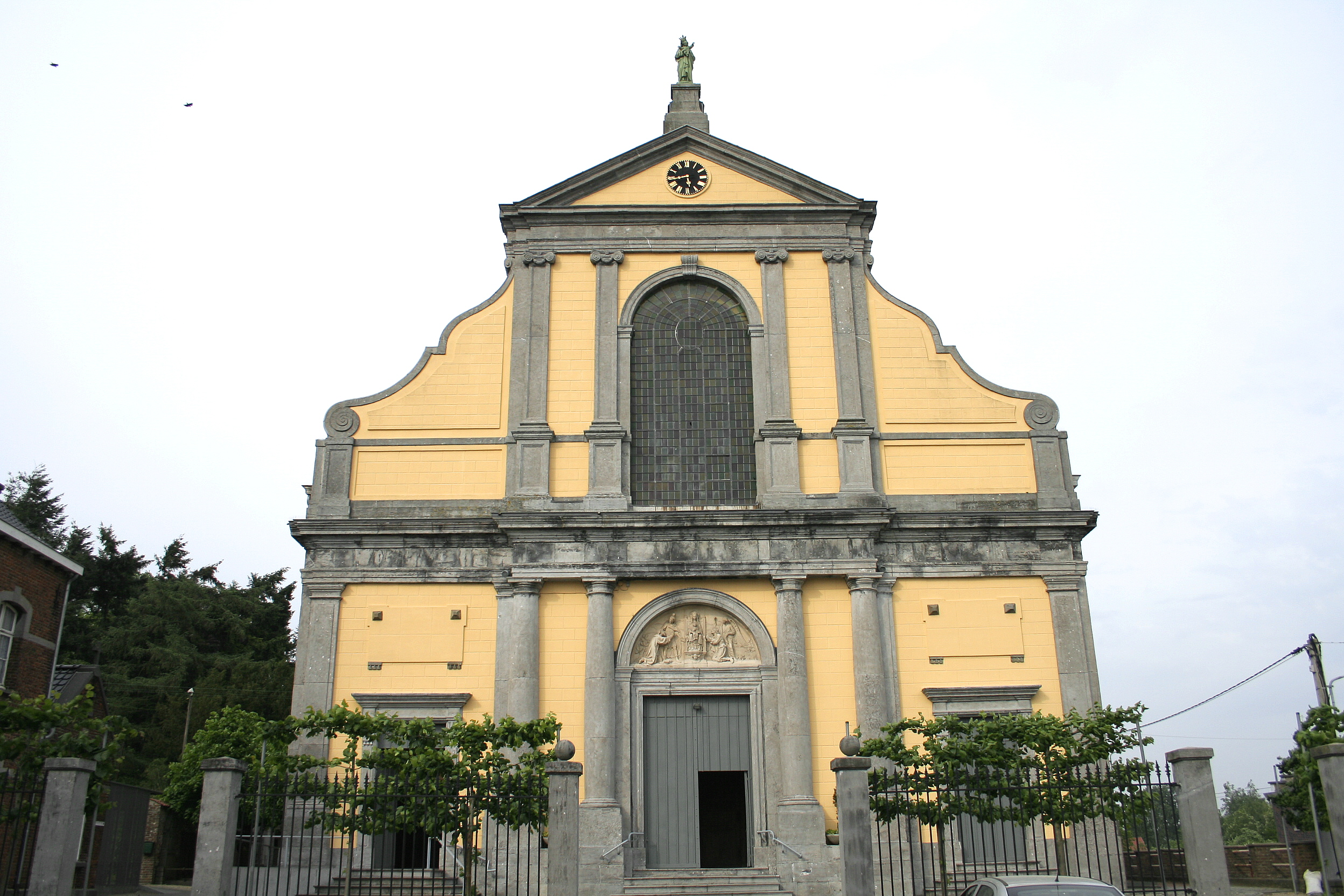

Religion
- Affiliation: Roman Catholic
- Ecclesiastical or organisational status: Minor basilica, Parish

Location
- Location: (Belgium) Chièvres
- Interactive map of Minor Basilica of Our Lady of Tongre; Notre Dame du Tongre
- Coordinates: 50°34′53.9″N 3°46′31.58″E

Architecture
- Architect: J.F. Demarbaix
- Type: Church
- Style: Baroque
- Completed: 1777

Specifications
- Direction of façade: SW
- Length: 60 metres (200 ft)
- Width: 20 metres (66 ft)

Website
- http://www.tongre-notre-dame.be/

The Basilica of Our Lady of Tongre (French: Basilique de Notre Dame de Tongre) is a Roman Catholic parish church and minor basilica in Tongre-Notre-Dame, Chièvres, Belgium. The shrine is small, yet rich in historical significance.

The shrine is known for its medieval seated image of the Madonna and Child, along with its collection of various jewels donated by pilgrims, including Belgian royalty. The image was granted a canonical coronation in an apostolic brief by Pope Leo XIII on 8 September 1881, with the coronation carried out by Bishop Isidore-Joseph du Rousseaux.

The image is not the same as that of Our Lady of Tongeren, Virgin of Joy, that was canonically crowned by Leo XIII in 1890 at the Basilica of Our Lady, Tongeren.

== Legend ==
On 1 February 1081, an image of the Virgin Mary mysteriously appeared in the garden of a certain Hector, the local lord, and later that day was removed to the parish church. The next day the image of Our Lady returned to the garden, mysteriously shrouded in light and music. This miracle was twice repeated. The lord consulted the Bishop of Cambrai, Gerald II, who, after investigation, allowed the image to be venerated. Hector built a chapel in the place where these extraordinary events had taken place, to house the miraculous image of the Virgin Mary, now known as Our Lady of Tongre.

The miraculous apparition of the statue of Notre-Dame de Tongre was visibly brought by angels through a white, bright cloud into the gardens of the castle of Sir Hector, Lord of the place, at about 11 o'clock in the evening of the first day of February, in the year 1081.

== History ==
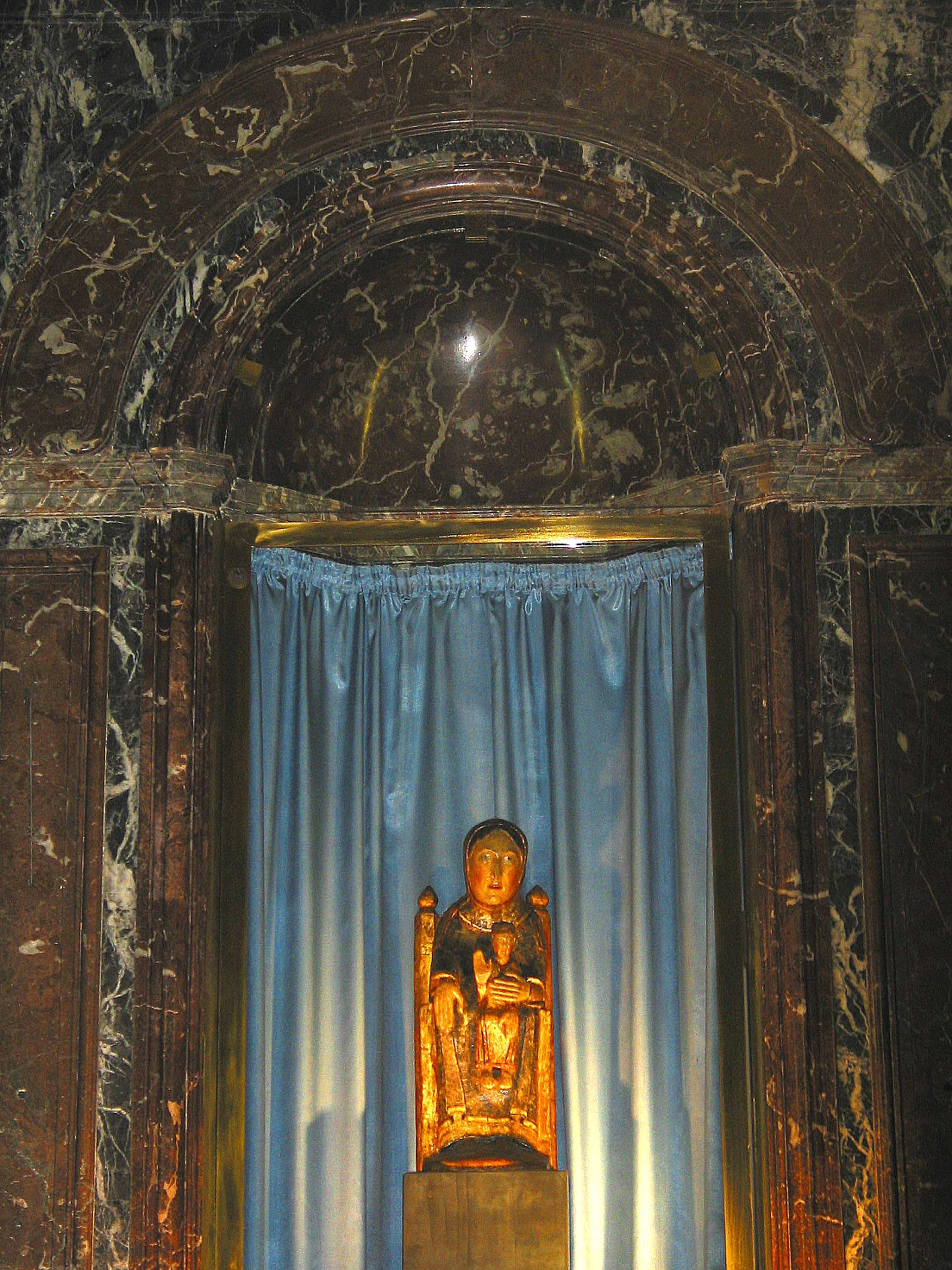
Statue of Our Lady of Tongre (1081)

A chapel was erected on 27 March 1081. In 1093, Pope Urban II established the brotherhood of Our Lady of Tongre. The place immediately attracted large numbers of pilgrims, especially as evidence of wonders and favours bestowed by the Virgin Mary began to circulate. In the 13th century, the original chapel was replaced by a Gothic church.

In 1662, Georges Huart, the local parish priest, compiled an overview of the miracles attributed to Our Lady of Tongre, L'histoire admirable de Nostre-Dame de Tongre.

Several important people visited the shrine of Tongre, including King Philip I of France, Maria Theresa of Spain and Marie Henriette of Austria (Queen of the Belgians). In homage to the Virgin Mary they gave many gifts (golden crowns, garments woven with gold or silver, cross relics, etc.) and during that time established the Treasury of the Basilica.

From the 17th century, this particular Marian devotion expanded beyond the Southern Netherlands and Northern France. In 1777, a decision was taken to build a larger church. This new church was designed by the architect Demarbaix and built in Baroque style. The cult was then spread further by Belgian priests.

Pope Leo XIII had the image crowned on the Feast of the Nativity of the Blessed Virgin Mary in 1881, while Pope Pius XII awarded the sanctuary the title of minor basilica on 25 April 1951, in a document executed by the Chancellor of the Apostolic Dataria, Gildo Brugnola.

== Marian Devotion ==
The most important feast of Our Lady of Tongre is Candlemas Eve, the night of 1–2 February, the anniversary of the apparition in Sir Hector's garden. A torchlit procession accompanies the statue on a route established by Gerald II, bishop of Cambrai, on 17 February 1081. Pilgrims visit the basilica year round.

The month of September is a month of special devotion. Our Lady of Tongre is revered as a 'loving mother' and the patron saint of dysfunctional families and injuries. She is also called upon by poets, writers and students.

== See also ==
- List of Catholic churches in Belgium
