= Hôtel de Groesbeeck - de Croix =

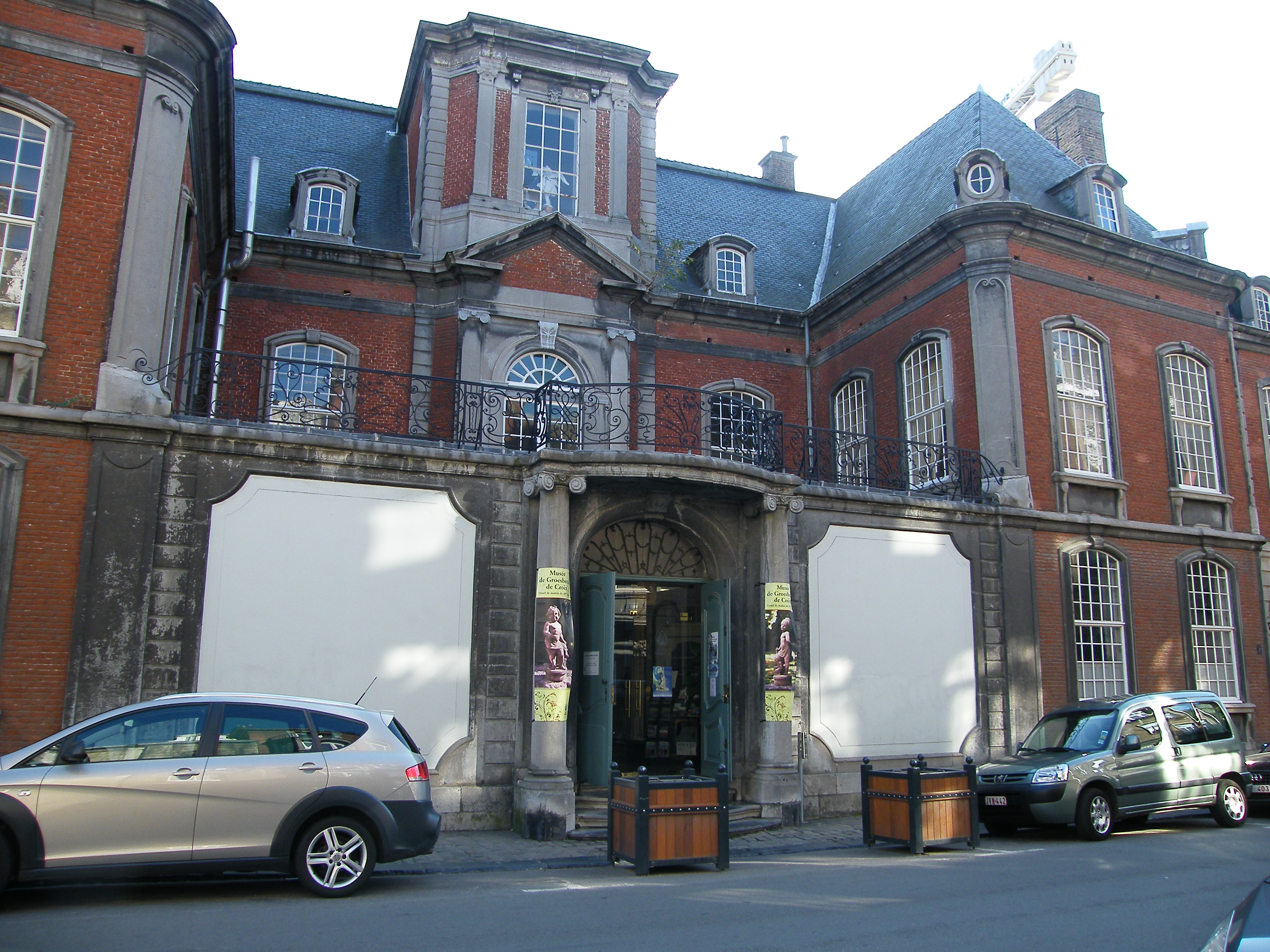
- Hôtel facade
- Interactive map of the Hôtel de Groesbeeck - de Croix area

General information
- Location: Namur, Belgium
- Coordinates: 50°27′48″N 4°51′40″E

The Hôtel de Groesbeeck - de Croix is a hotel particulier in Namur, Belgium. First built in the 13th century, it was resdesigned by the architect Jean-Baptiste Chermanne in the mid 18th century. The town council bought it in 1935 and it now houses the town's collection of 19th, 20th and 21st century decorative arts. It has been closed for restoration since February 2013 and is due to reopen at the end of 2018 or early in 2019.

== Sources ==
- https://web.archive.org/web/20160402141132/http://ville.namur.be/page.asp?id=5430&langue=FR
