= Hôtel de Grady =

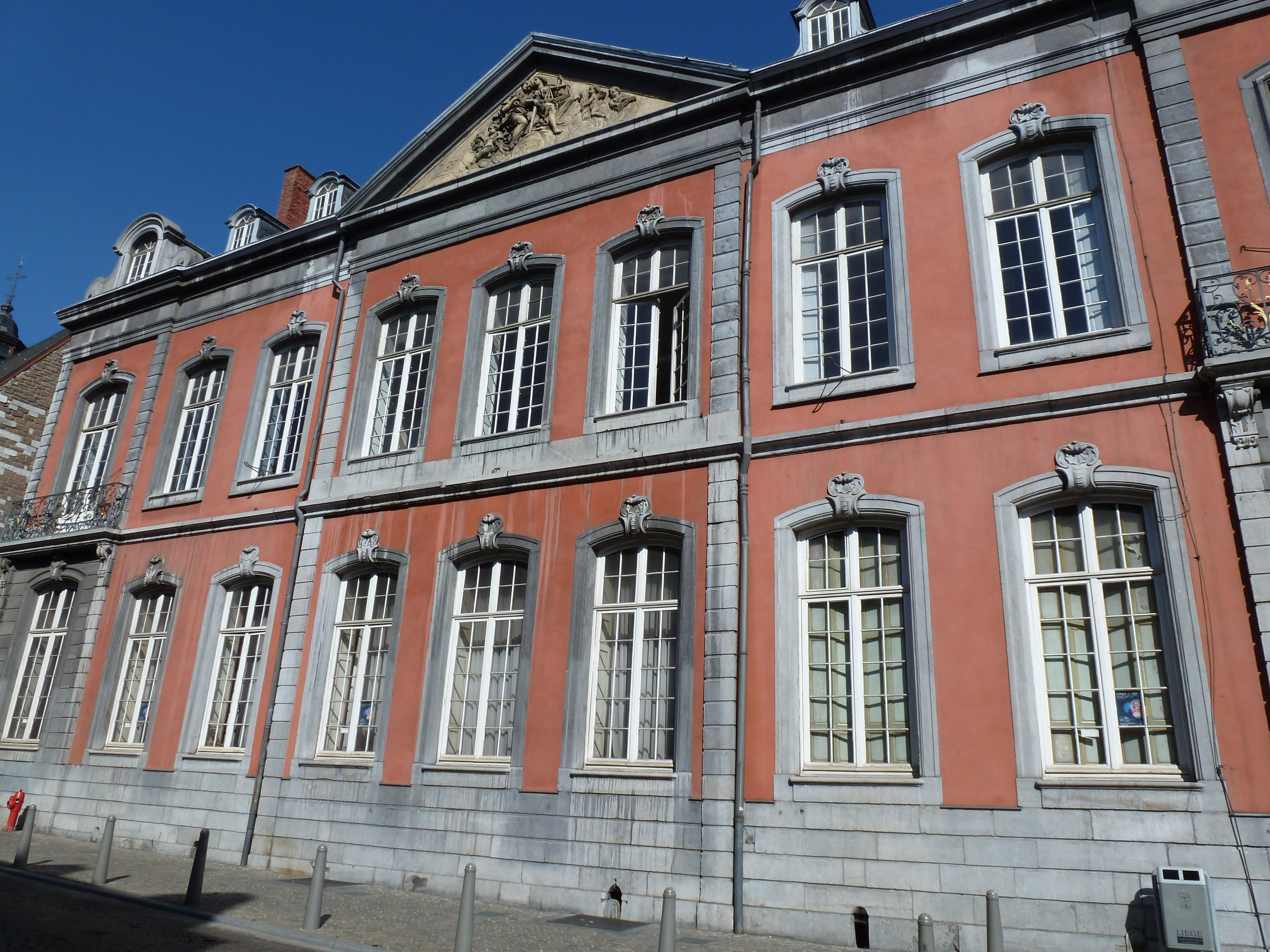
- Hôtel de Grady
- Interactive map of the Hôtel de Grady area

General information
- Architectural style: Neoclassical Architecture
- Location: Liège, Belgium
- Coordinates: 50°38′49″N 5°34′39″E
- Construction started: 1765
- Owner: City of Liège

The Hôtel de Grady is a hotel particulier in Liège in Belgium, sited at 5 rue Hors-Château. It is also known as the Hôtel Sklins or Hôtel de.

== History ==
It was first commissioned in 1765 by Nicolas de Spirlet, privy counsellor to the prince bishop of Liège. The Grady family had been tanners in Outremeuse but they gained a fortune by trade and included lawyers, a deputy and a number of major magistrates. They even married into the Liège aristocracy, including a marriage into the Stockhem family, their neighbours.

The construction of the Hôtel de Grady, commissioned by Nicolas de Spirlet, private adviser to the prince-bishop, dates from 1765. It was rebuilt on the site of three residences. The Gradys are a family of tanners established in Outremeuse. Enriched by trade, the family began a social ascent which made its members lawyers, aldermen, deputy and high magistrates. Matrimonial alliances opened the doors of the Liège aristocracy to them, and in particular the Stockhem, who were their neighbors. One of the houses on which the hotel is built belongs to a Spirlet, hence some confusion as to the origin of Grady Hotel. Confusion that Grady's hotel will be sold to a wine merchant, Spirlet.

The hotel will then go through various owners and then be expropriated by the City of Liège, which wanted to set up a museum there. The project did not succeed and, after having housed the alderman for public education, the Hôtel de Grady became, along with the Hôtel de Stockhem, the seat of the Liège hotel school.

This building should not be confused with the old Grady hotel, also located in Liège, rue Saint-Pierre.

== Description ==
The triangular pediment dated 1765 represents an allegory of the functions of private councilor of the prince-bishop.

== Grading ==
The Hôtel de Grady was listed as a Walloon Region's real estate heritage in 1941.

== See also ==
- fr:Rue Hors-Château
- fr:Patrimoine privé de Liège
- fr:Liste du patrimoine immobilier classé de Liège/A-H

== Sources ==
- lampspw.wallonie.be
