= Colonster Castle =

Coordinates: 50°34′45″N 5°35′46″E

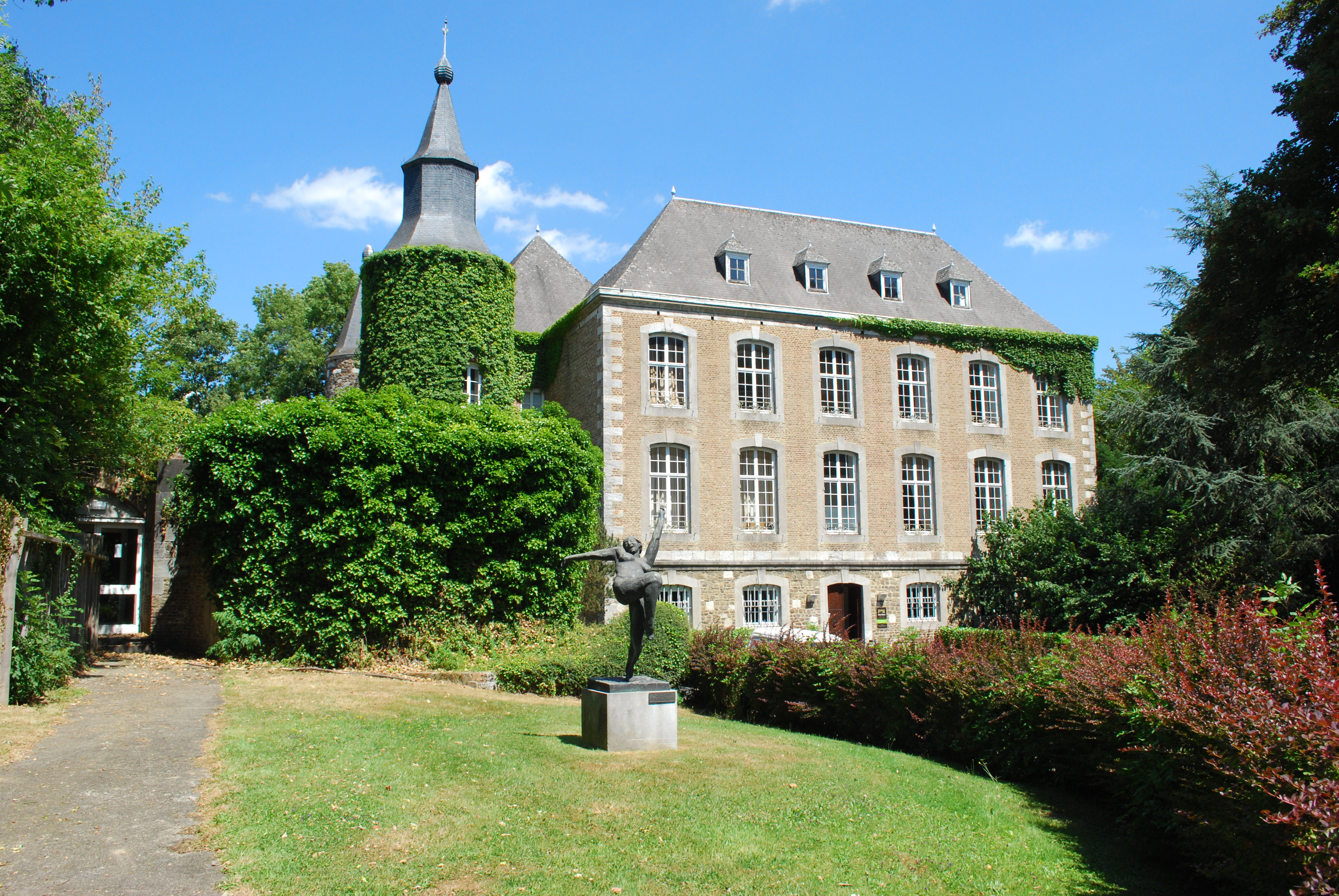
Its south facade

Colonster Castle (Château de Colonster) is a castle near Liège in Wallonia, Belgium, sited on a rocky spur in the Ourthe valley. It was first recorded in the 14th century but its present appearance is that of an 18th-century rebuild by Maximilien-Henri de Horion, which turned it from a stronghold into a pleasure palace, with interiors decorated by Paul-Joseph Delcloche. It and its park were acquired in 1963 by the University of Liège. The building now offers reception areas for corporate hire.

== Bibliography (in French) ==
- Université de Liège. Cahiers du Sart Tilman. Cahier n° 1, Liège, 1963, pp. 47–50.
- Marc Bouchat, « Le château de Colonster », Bulletin de la Commission royale des Monuments et des Sites, Commission royale des Monuments et des Sites, t. 9, 1980, p. 159-290 (lire en ligne [archive])
- Pierre Gathy, Marc Bouchat, Le château de Colonster et son parc, (Université de Liège, collection "Les guides scientifiques du Sart Tilman", n° 5), 80 p., (c.1990).
