= Maximilien-Henri de Horion =

Count Maximilien-Henri-Hyacinthe de Horion, seigneur de Colonster (14 April 1694 – 24 May 1759) was an 18th-century politician from Liège.

He was the son of Gérard Assuere de Horion, Seigneur de Colonster and grand mayor of Liège and his wife Justine Hélène de Bentinck. He was chief advisor to prince bishop Johann Theodor of Bavaria and - during the latter's frequent trips away from the Principality of Liège - was its de facto ruler. Johann Theodor allowed Pierre Rousseau to base himself in Liège from 1756 onwards and de Horion supported him and other Enlightenment thinkers. He also rebuilt the château de Colonster as a pleasure palace - his salons in the north wing still survive.

== Bibliography ==
- (in French) Pierre Colman, « Un tableau bien connu, et cependant méconnu peint par Paul-Joseph Delcloche en 1749 : le « repas à la cour du prince-évêque Jean-Théodore de Bavière » en réalité « la famille du comte de Horion » », Chroniques d'archéologie et d'histoire du pays de Liège, vol. I, nos 14–15, avril-septembre 2001
