= Jean-François-Paul-Emile d'Oultremont =

Belgian noble (1679–1737)

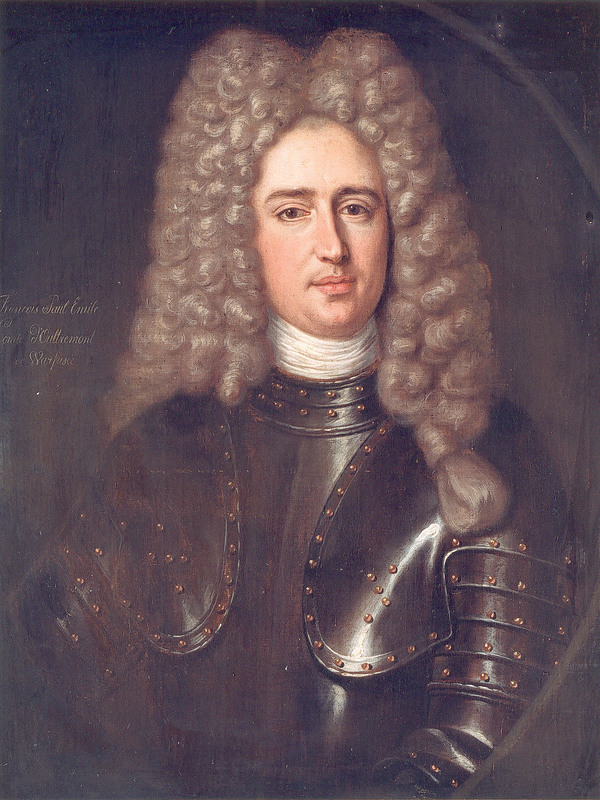

Jean-François-Paul-Emile d'Oultremont (April 20, 1679 – November 22, 1737), Count of Oultremont and of the Holy Roman Empire, Baron of Han-sur-Lesse, lord of Chevetogne, pair of the Duchy of Luxembourg, Great Bailiff of Moha, etc., was the son of Jean-Baptiste d'Oultremont and Marie-Jacqueline de Berlaymont.

In 1731, he became the first member of the Oultremont family to carry the title of count. All the present Counts of Oultremont descend from him and his wife, Marie-Isabelle of Bavaria. He was the father of 8 children, including Charles-Nicolas d'Oultremont, who became Prince-Bishop of Liège.
