= Castle of Warfusée =

Castle in Wallonia, Belgium

- Wallonia, Belgium
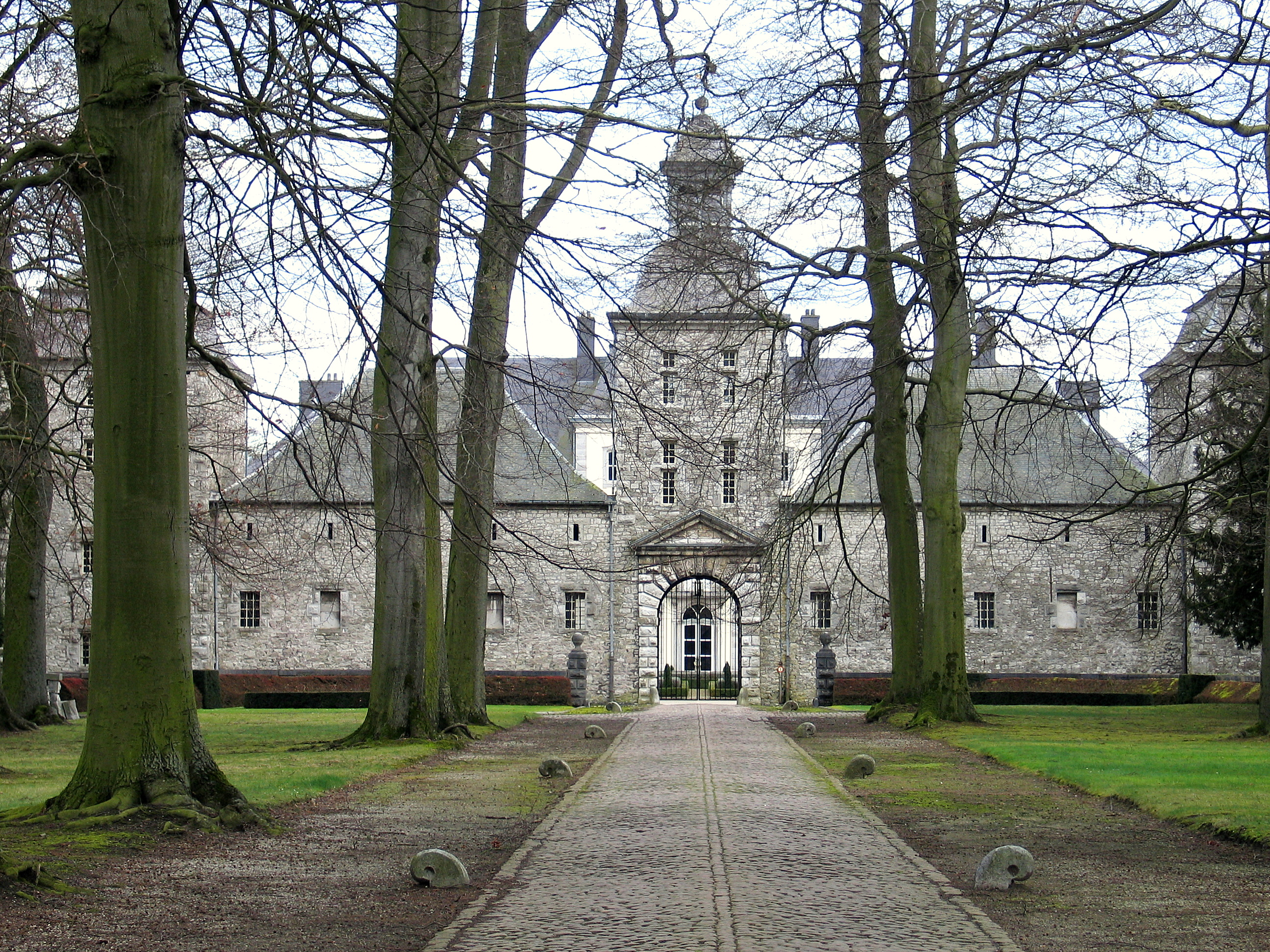

Site information
- Type: Castle

Location
- Coordinates: 50.585°N 5.370°E

Castle of Warfusée is a castle located in the municipality Saint-Georges-sur-Meuse, Wallonia, near Liège, in Belgium. One of the loveliest castles in the area, Warfusée was completed in 1754 as a replacement for an earlier Renaissance structure. The castle served as a summer residence for Charles-Nicolas d'Oultremont, Prince-Bishop of Liège from 1763 to 1771, brother of the proprietor. To this day it still is the main residence of the Earls of d'Outremont. Access to the yard is via a gate under a tower with a steeple. The main building is flanked by two lower wings marking the boundaries of a vast yard. The rich interior has remained pretty much as it was at the time of building. The interior is truly exceptional; many talented artists were called upon: stuccos in the chapel, the superb entrance hall paved with marble with its beautiful staircase, the various drawing rooms with tapestry, the dining room with walls decorated with hand-painted engravings, and the huge library.

The house is open to the public upon request for groups only.

== See also ==
- List of castles in Belgium
- Van Renesse de Warfusée
