= Horemans =

Horemans:

- Gwendoline Horemans
- Jan Josef Horemans:
  - Jan Josef Horemans the Elder
  - Jan Josef Horemans the Younger
- Peter Jacob Horemans (1700–1776) was a Flemish painter of genre scenes, portraits, conversation pieces, still lifes and city views.
- Siebe Horemans (born 1998) is a Belgian professional footballer.
