= Schleissheim Palace =

Group of three individual palaces in Munich, Bavaria, Germany

Coordinates: 48°14′55″N 11°34′06″E

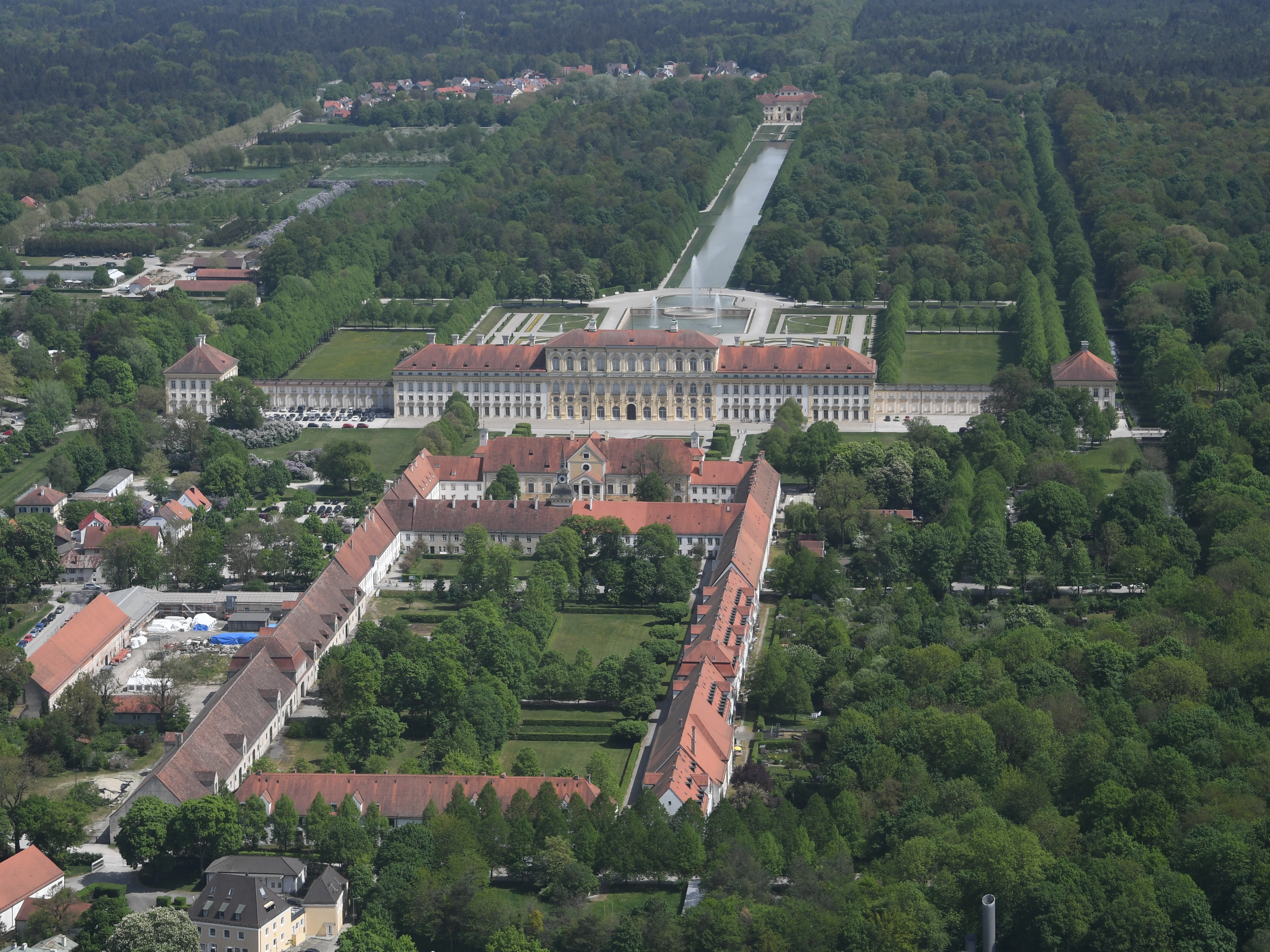
Aerial image of the Schleißheim Palace

Schleissheim Palace, Munich

The Schleißheim Palace (German: Schloss Schleißheim) is a complex of three individual palaces – the Old, Lustheim, and New – in a grand Baroque park in the village of Oberschleißheim, a suburb of Munich, Bavaria, Germany. The palace was a summer residence of the Bavarian rulers of the House of Wittelsbach.

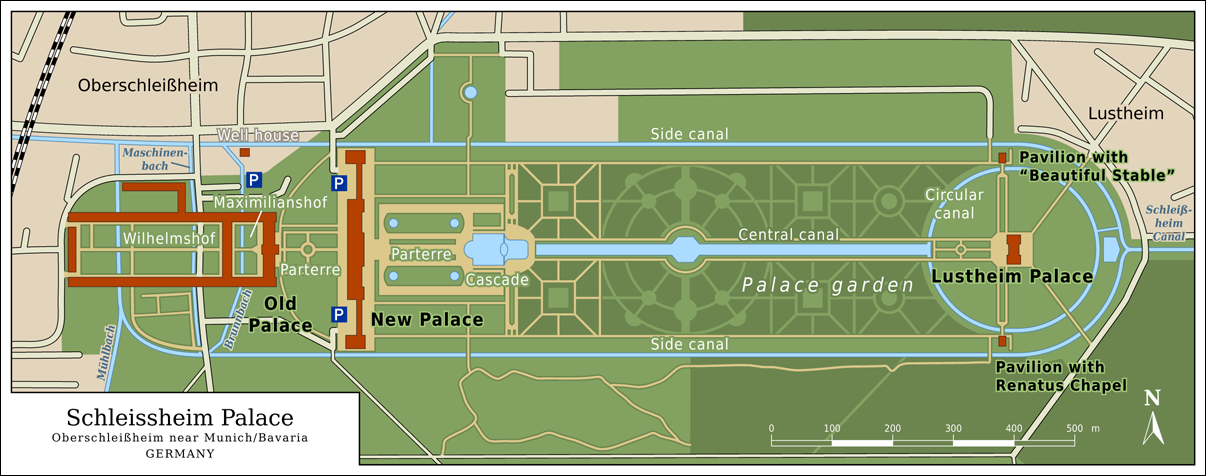
Plot plan of the grounds

== The palaces ==
=== Old Schleissheim Palace ===
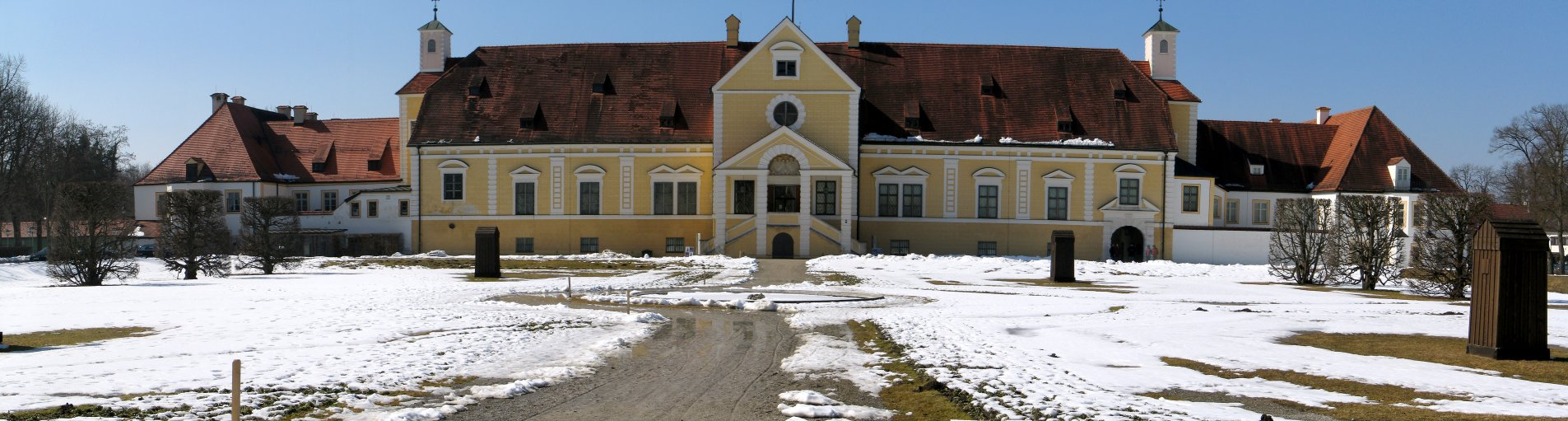
Old Palace Schleißheim from the east

The history of Schleißheim Palace started with a Renaissance country house (1598) and hermitage founded by William V close to Dachau Palace. The central gate and clock tower between both courtyards both date back to the first building period. The inner courtyard is called Maximilianshof, the outer one Wilhelmshof. Under William's son Maximilian I the buildings were extended between 1617 and 1623 by Heinrich Schön and Hans Krumpper to form the so-called Old Palace. This plan is typologically similar to the castle of Laufzorn in Oberhaching begun by Maximilian's brother Albert the year before. There, too, a free staircase leads up to the first floor, which is used as a mansion. The building, which was designed in the style of Andrea Palladio in the late Renaissance, was completed in 1623.

The rooms were decorated by Peter Candid. Maximilian's son and successor Ferdinand Maria died here in 1679. After heavy destruction in the Second World War the palace with its spacious buildings was reconstructed. Most of the stucco decoration of the chapel Wilhelmskapelle has been preserved. The Old Schleißheim Palace houses today two exhibitions, one on religious culture, the other the history of Prussia. The Grand Hall in the middle of the main building today serves as foyer for the museums.

In the garden of the Old Palace is a memorial to the Royal Bavarian Air Force, who served during World War I at the airfield next to the palace grounds.

=== Lustheim Palace ===
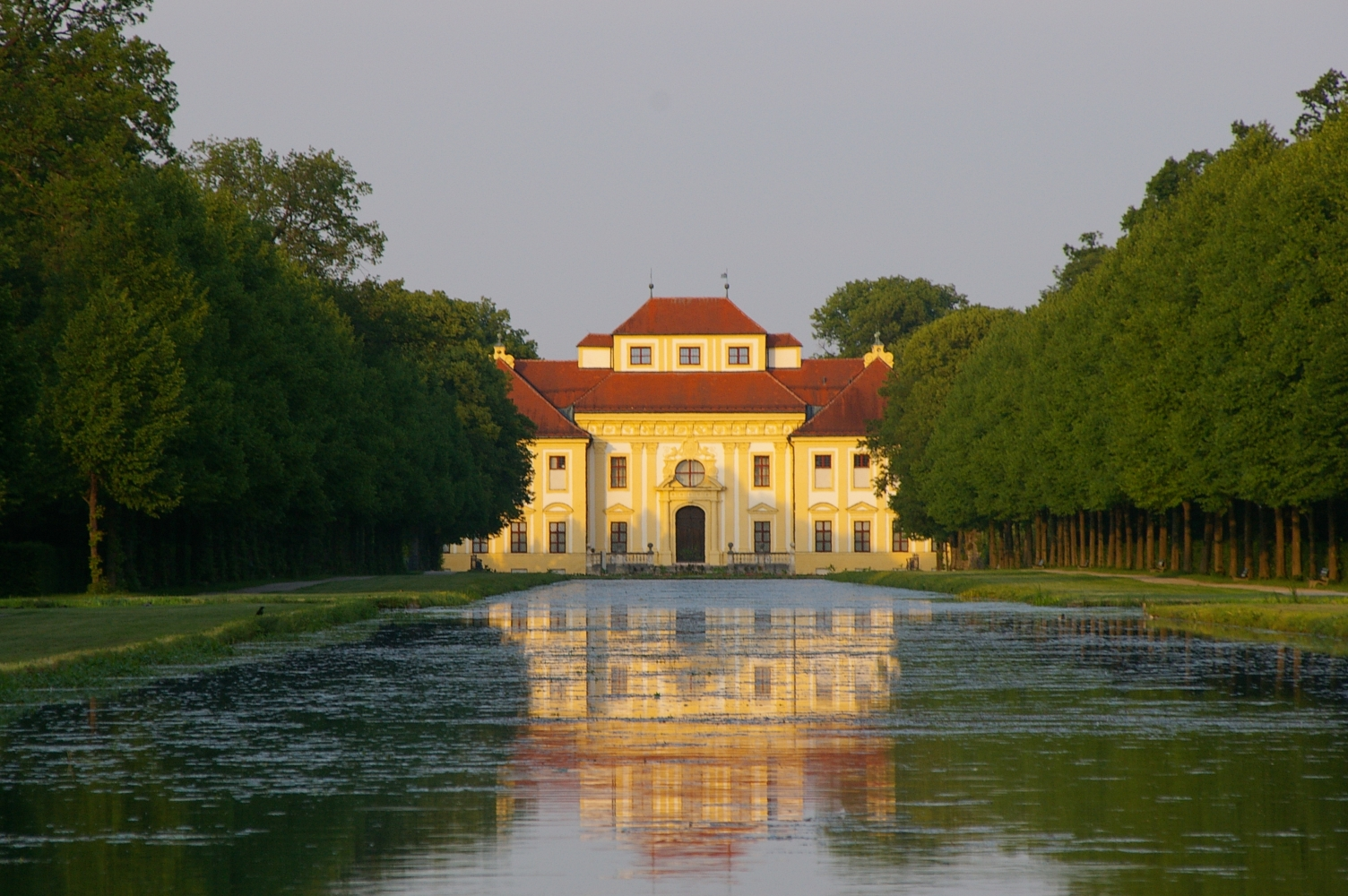
Lustheim Palace from the west, with canal

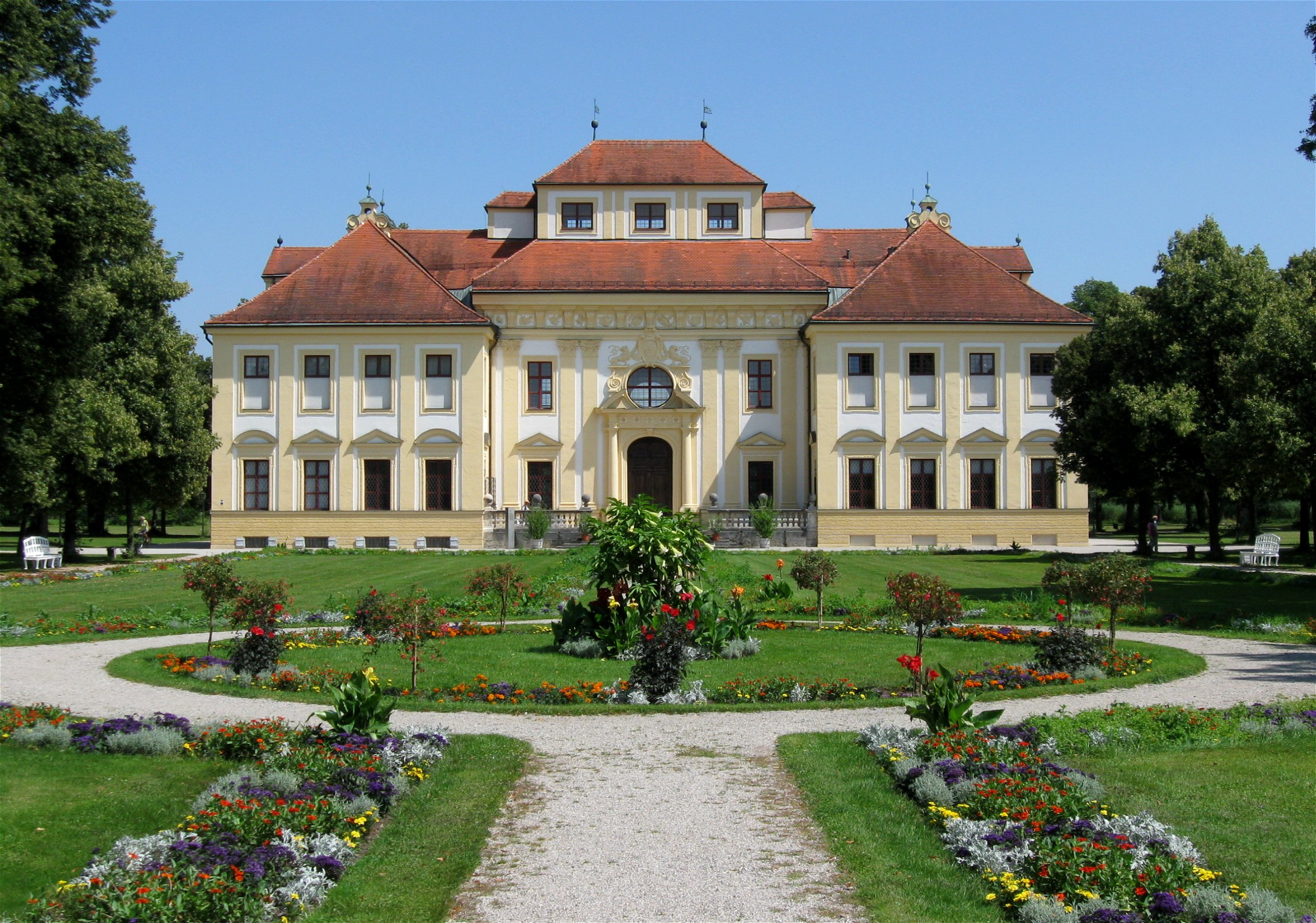
Lustheim Palace from the east, with bosquet area

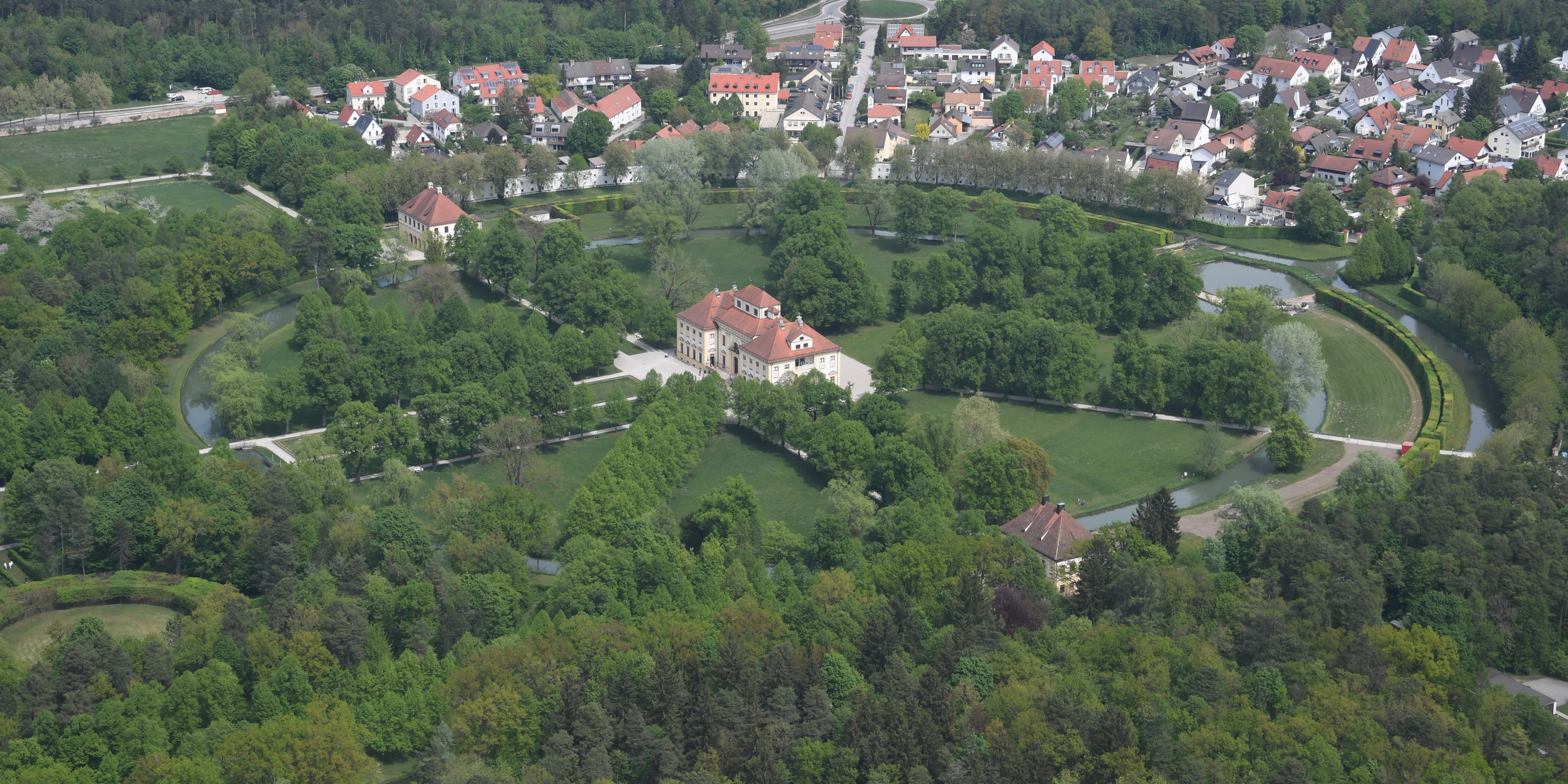
Aerial image of Lustheim Palace

Then Enrico Zuccalli built Lustheim Palace as a garden villa in Italian style in 1684–1688 for Maximilian II Emanuel and his first wife, the Austrian princess Maria Antonia.

Lustheim lies on a circular island and forms as a point de vue the conclusion of the baroque court garden. The floor plan of manor reminiscent of a stylized H, to the central main building will be followed by two wing-like avant-corps. The brick built and plastered building has two storeys, the middle section is dominated by a belvedere, which provides a wide view of the surrounding countryside. The center of the palace is the great hall in the middle section, which is flanked laterally by the apartments of the Elector and Electress. Upstairs rooms were simple for the servants, the basement contained the kitchen and utility rooms.

The interior is dominated by the large banqueting hall in the middle of the building. The frescoes were done by Johann Anton Gumpp, Francesco Rosa and Johann Andreas Trubillio.

Since 1968 the palace has housed a grand collection of Meissen porcelain, only outranged by the Dresden Porcelain Collection in the Zwinger, Dresden.

The palace once formed the centre point of a semicircle of round buildings. Two pavillons still exist: To the south of Lustheim Place the Renatus Chapel was erected in 1686 by Zuccalli in the southern pavillon. The northern pavillon houses the decorated stable which was built for the favourite horses of Elector Max Emanuel.

=== New Schleißheim Palace ===
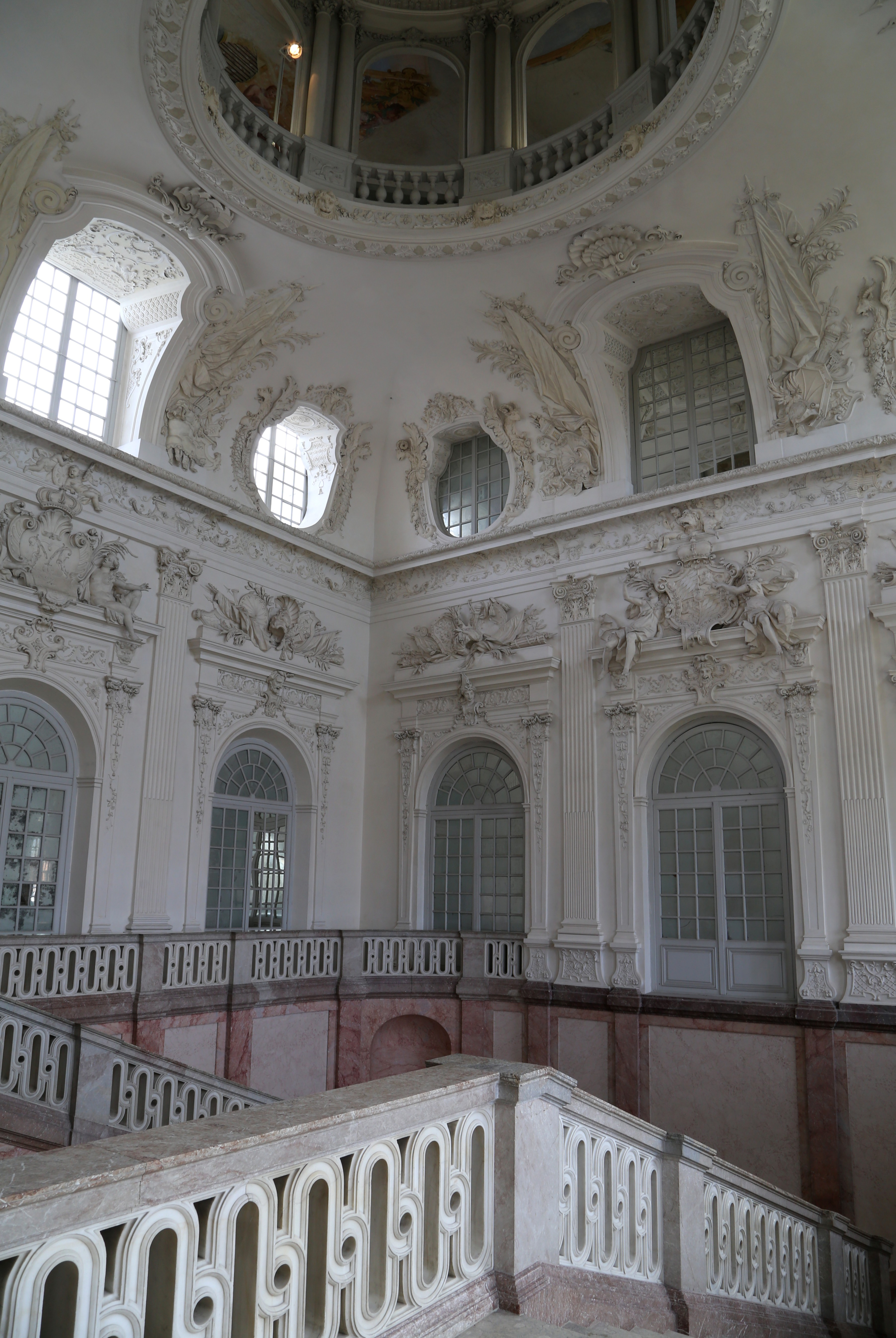
Grand Staircase

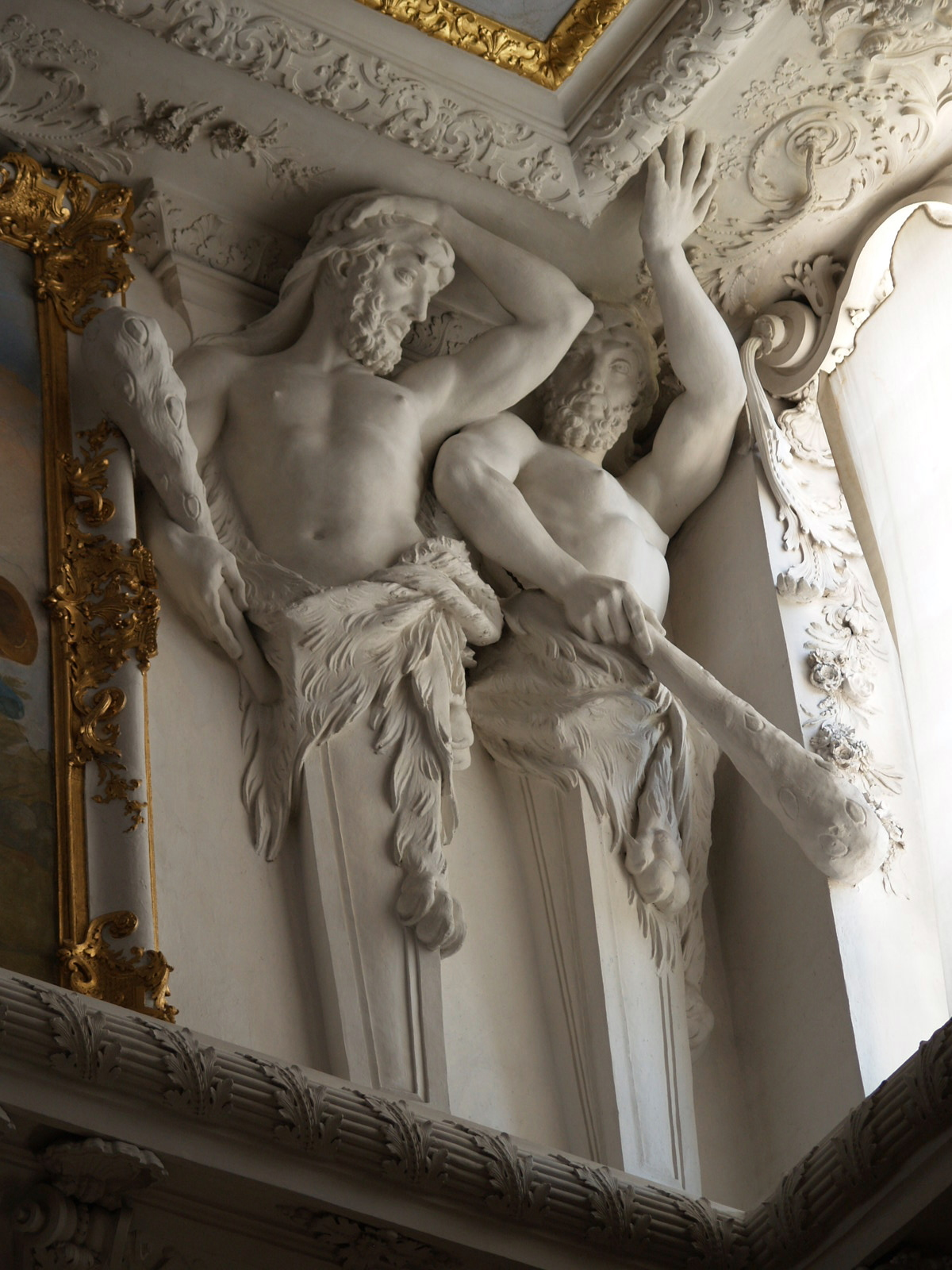
Atlantes as decoration of the Gartensaal

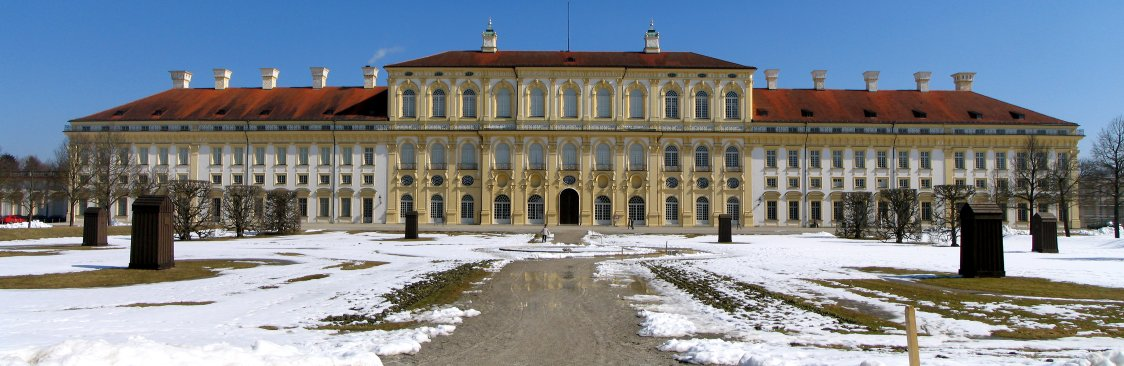
New Palace Schleißheim from the west during winter months

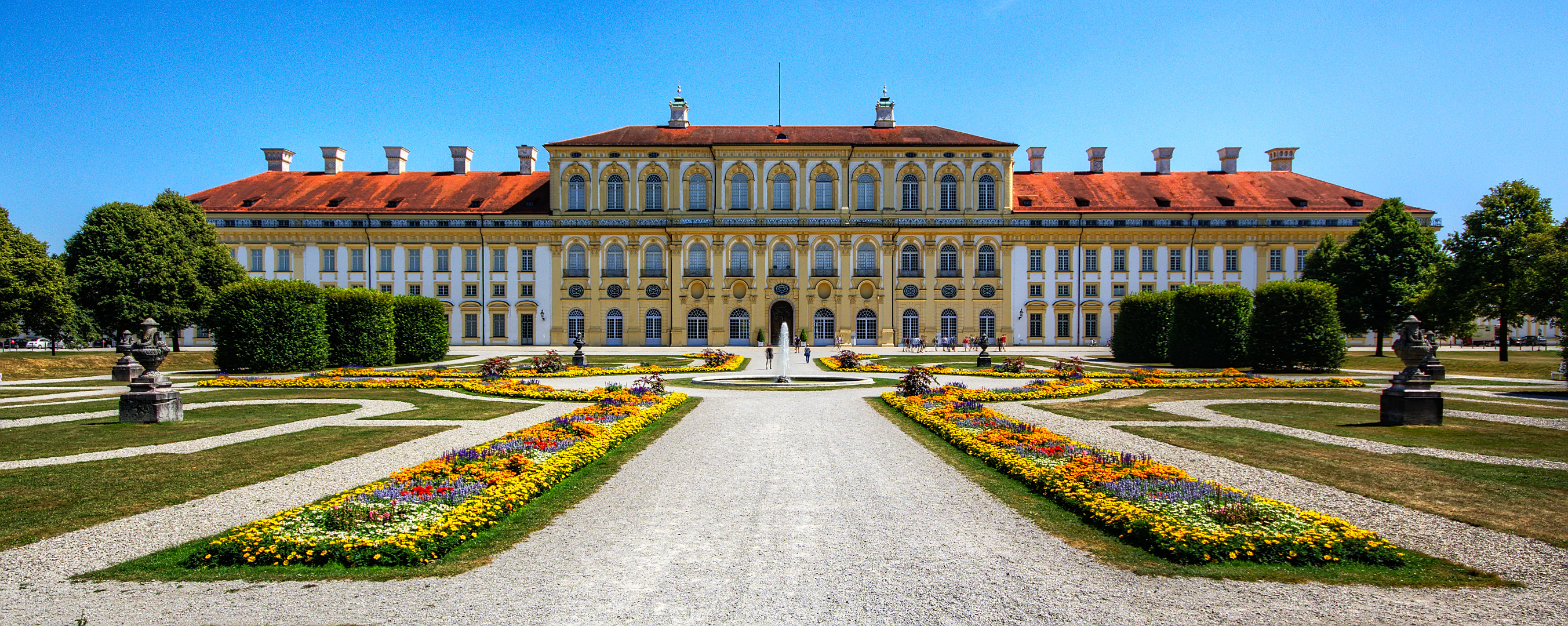
View of the new palace and its baroque gardens from the west during summer months

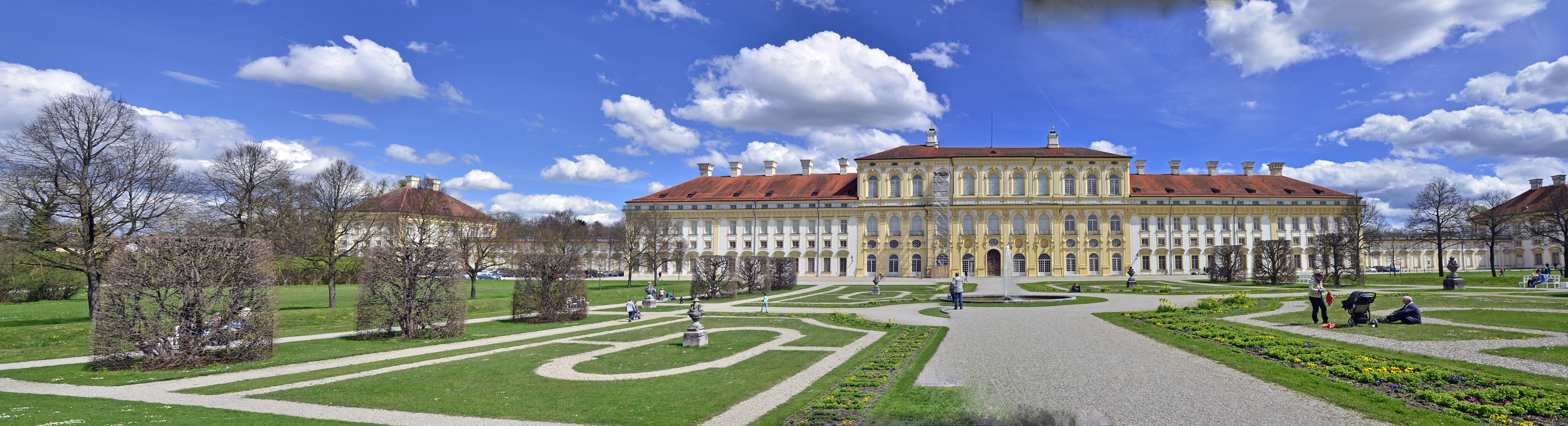
The New Palace from the west

Zuccalli also finally erected the Baroque New Palace between the two palaces in 1701–1704 as the new residence, since the elector expected the imperial crown. But after Max Emanuel had lost Bavaria for some years in the War of the Spanish Succession, the construction work was interrupted. Joseph Effner enlarged the building to one of the most impressive Baroque palaces in 1719–1726. But only the main wing was completed.

The New Palace is a wide-bearing construction of more than 300 meters in length. The main building, the corps de logis, is divided by 37 garden-sided window bays, eleven axes fall on the middle section with the grand staircase, the ballroom and the gallery. The middle section is structured with pilasters. The main wing is connected by arcades with two pavilions in the south and in the north, the southern pavilion should serve as a guest house, the northern one keeps the pumping station for the trick fountains of the park. The central building of the castle has three storeys. The top floor of the central building is set back garden side, so there is a large terrace. This terrace is the result of a change in the draft, after parts of the garden facade were still collapsed during construction due to an insufficient foundation.

Important examples of German baroque architecture are especially the Grand Hall, the Grand Gallery, the wide staircase, the Maximilian's Chapel and the four state apartments decorated by artists such as Charles Dubut, Franz Joachim Beich, Johann Baptist Zimmermann, Cosmas Damian Asam, Jacopo Amigoni, Giuseppe Volpini, Guillielmus de Grof (Wilhelm de Groff) and Antoine Motté. Max Emanuel's fame as a triumphant general was the overall theme. The Grand Gallery was constructed in line with a draft provided by Robert de Cotte. The Victory Hall, the Red Cabinet and the Chapel of the Electress keep the most significant interior decorations. The Grand Staircase of Zuccalli is particularly significant in terms of architecture: The stairs and pedestals lie within a high, wide hall, an idea which Balthasar Neumann later took up in the design of the palace of Augustusburg in Brühl and the Residence Palace in Würzburg. The dome fresco by Cosmas Damian Asam depicts Venus in the blacksmiths of the volcano, where the weapons are made for her son Aeneas, who is wearing the facial features of Elector Max Emanuel. Most of the rooms still show their original late baroque decoration celebrating the elector's victories against the Turks. The entirely preserved Gobelin tapestries were acquired by Max Emanuel from Flemish manufacturies when he served as Governor for the Spanish Netherlands.

Max Emanuels's son Emperor Charles VII Albert preferred the more private atmosphere of Nymphenburg Palace, so only one of four planned wings was completed.

But Max Emanuel's grandson Maximilian III Joseph ordered some rooms to be redecorated in Rococo style. In 1763 Ignaz Günther decorated the wings of the east portal with allegorical adornments. Under King Ludwig I Leo von Klenze finally completed the Great Staircase.

Klenze's neoclassical alterations of the façade were not restored with the renovation after the destructions in World War II.

== The gallery of baroque paintings ==
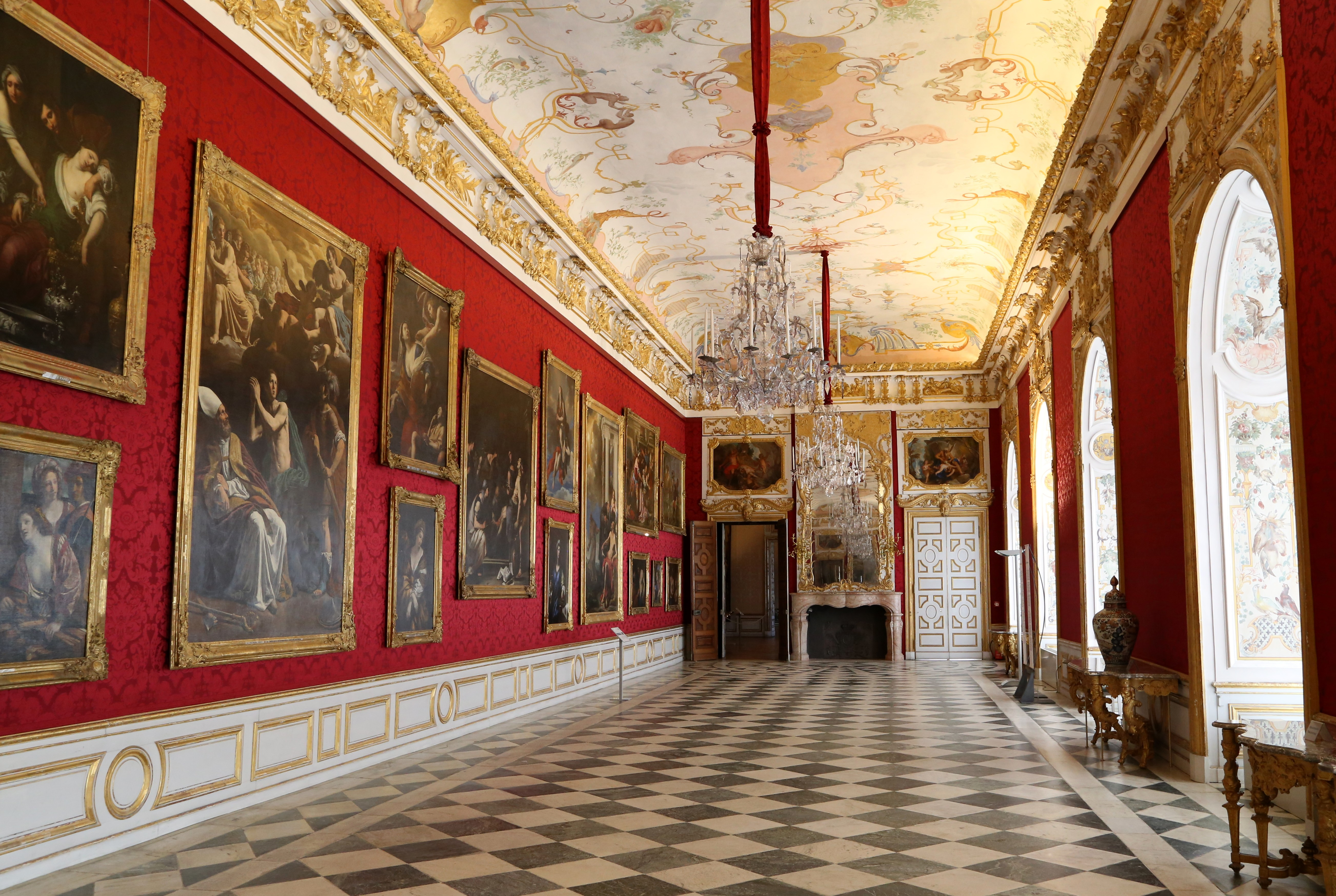
Grand Gallery

The gallery of baroque paintings owned by the Bavarian State Picture Collections is today exhibited in several rooms. Among the artists are Flemish Baroque painters such as Peter Paul Rubens and Anthony van Dyck, Italians like Guido Reni, Luca Giordano, Guercino, Carlo Saraceni, Marcantonio Bassetti, Alessandro Turchi, Carlo Dolci and Pietro da Cortona, but also the Germans Joachim von Sandrart, Johann Heinrich Schönfeld and Johann Carl Loth and the Spanish painters Alonso Cano, José Antolínez and José de Ribera.

The French paintings of the 17th and 18th centuries exhibited in the palace are for the most part historically closely related to Elector Max Emanuel and his family. For example, some pictures of Pierre-Denis Martin show his French and Polish relatives, his sister was married to the Grand Dauphin, he himself was in a second marriage engaged with a daughter of the Polish king Jan Sobieski. A huge historiography of Joseph Vivien deals with the reunion of the Elector with his family in 1715. Rooms with battle paintings are celebrating the Elector.

The former Gardesaal, converted from 1762 to a new dining room, shows the portraits of all the Electorates of Bavaria between 1597 and 1777. On the north wall are a portraits of Maximilian I by Nikolaus Prugger, a portrait of Ferdinand Marias in standing position by George Desmarées and a depiction of Max II Emanuel on horseback as a commander by Martin Maingaud, on the south wall shows equestrian portraits of Charles Albert and Max III. Joseph by Desmarées. The canvas paintings, which are embedded in the walls, are older and had been retrofitted to today's frame size.

In 1852, over 1000 paintings that had been in storage at the Bayerische Staatsgemäldesammlungen in Schleißheim, Augsburg and Nuremberg were sold at a public auction with the permission of the Bavarian royal house. The proceedings were used to fund modern acquisitions for the Wittelsbach portrait gallery.

== The park ==
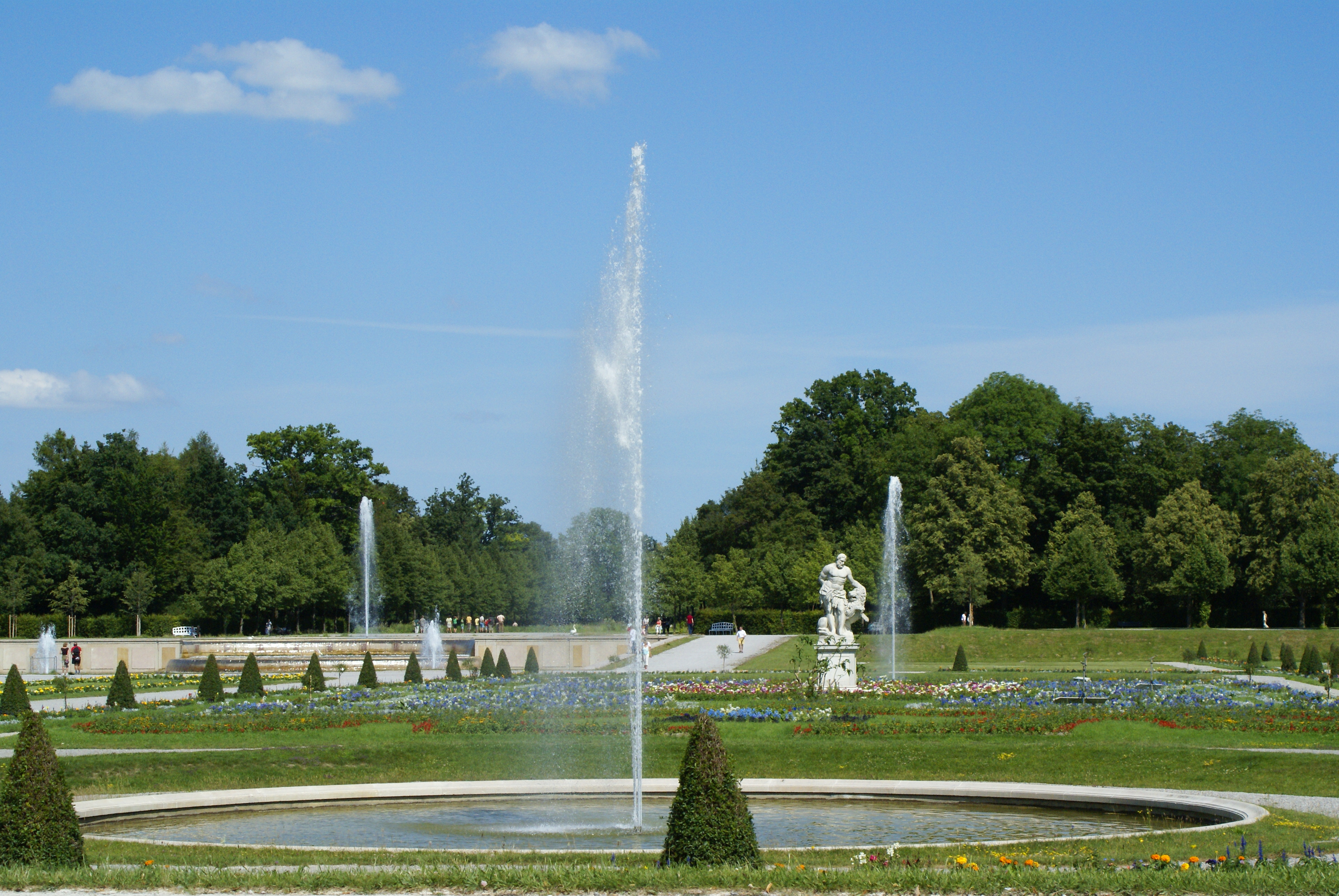
Schleißheim Park

The grand park is one of the rare preserved Baroque gardens in Germany. Its structure with canals and bosquet area was arranged by Zuccalli. Dominique Girard, a pupil of Le Nôtre, constructed the grand parterre and the cascade until 1720. Water is a central element in the garden, with the Grand Canal in the garden center and channel round Lustheim island connecting to the Schleißheim Canal, a part of the Munich channel system of waterways that also connected to the complex of Nymphenburg Palace.

From the Old Palace, a line of sight goes south to the Frauenkirche in Munich, which is also the end point of another line of sight of the Fürstenried Palace. The northern side channel has finally Dachau Palace as target.

In the Brunnhaus (well house), which was built in 1867 north of the Old Palace by Carl von Effner, the waterwheel and the pumps are still present, the fountains are, however, now powered by electric pumps.

The Palace Garden is also the home of a 300-year-old tree that has survived several lightning strikes.

== Beer garden ==
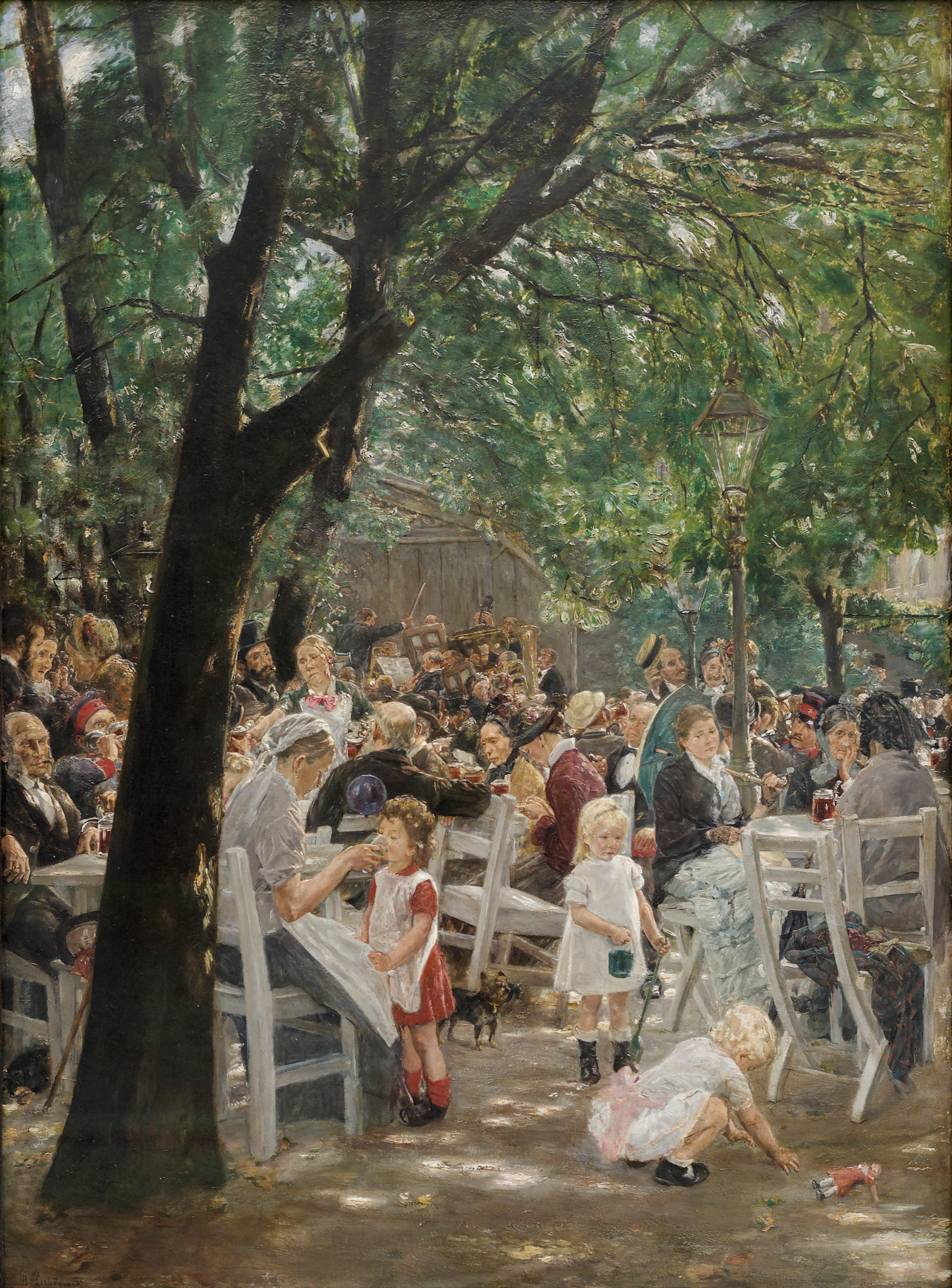

The Schlosswirtschaft Oberschleißheim Biergarten is located on the palace grounds, with seating for 1,000. Its roots trace back to 1597, when the founder of the Hofbräuhaus brewery retired to a farm there. Following the building of the New Schleißheim Palace in the 17th century, the Schlosswirtschaft (palace restaurant) provided catering to its workers and servants. A royal brewery followed and remained commercial at the site for a long time before closing. Hofbräuhaus beers and traditional Bavarian fare are served in the area today, in an area containing a number of chestnut trees and a view of the palace.

== As film location ==
Several notable motion pictures have used Schleißheim Palace as a film location:

- Decision Before Dawn (1951) directed by Anatole Litvak used interiors and exteriors of Schleißheim when the Oskar Werner medic/spy character is picked to become an aide to a panzer General.
- Paths of Glory (1957) directed by Stanley Kubrick used the palace and its grounds extensively. The palace served as the French Army division headquarters; the execution of the World War I French soldiers was filmed in the grand garden of the New Palace (Gartenfassade des Neuen Schlosses); and the court martial in the Great Hall (Grosser Saal) inside the palace.
- Last Year at Marienbad (1961) directed by Alain Resnais used the palace (along with two others in Munich) as a principal filming location.
- The Three Musketeers (2011) filmed some scenes in the palace.
- Per me, per sempre (2001 Music Video: Eros Ramazzotti) Directed by Paolo Scarfo'. Cinematographer: Massimo Zeri. Entirely shot in the palace.

== Tourism ==
Oberschleißheim village and Schleißheim Palace are accessible by the Munich S-Bahn number 1. This line passes through the city centre, including Stachus and the main train station.

Museums:

- Gertrud Weinhold Ecumenical Collection (branch museum of the Bavarian National Museum, Old Palace)
- East and West Prussia Collection (Bavarian National Museum, Old Palace)
- Meißen porcelain collection (Bavarian National Museum, Lustheim Palace)
- Gallery of baroque paintings (part of the Bavarian State Painting Collections, New Palace)

== See also ==
- List of Baroque residences
