= Jan Josef Horemans =

Jan Josef Horemans may refer to two Flemish artists, father and son:

- Jan Josef Horemans the Elder (1682–1759)
- Jan Josef Horemans the Younger (1714–1792)
