= Carl von Effner =

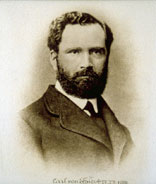
Portrait photograph c.1880

Carl von Effner, also Karl von Effner, Carl Joseph von Effner and Carl Effner (the younger) (10 February 1831 – 22 October 1884) was gardener to the Bavarian court, later Königlich Bayerischer Hofgärtendirektor ("Royal Bavarian Court Director of Gardens"), and landscape gardener.

== Family background ==
Carl von Effner was descended from the Effner family, who for many years were gardeners in the service of the Bavarian royal court. He was great-grandson of the distinguished architect and builder Joseph Effner (1687–1745)

== Life ==
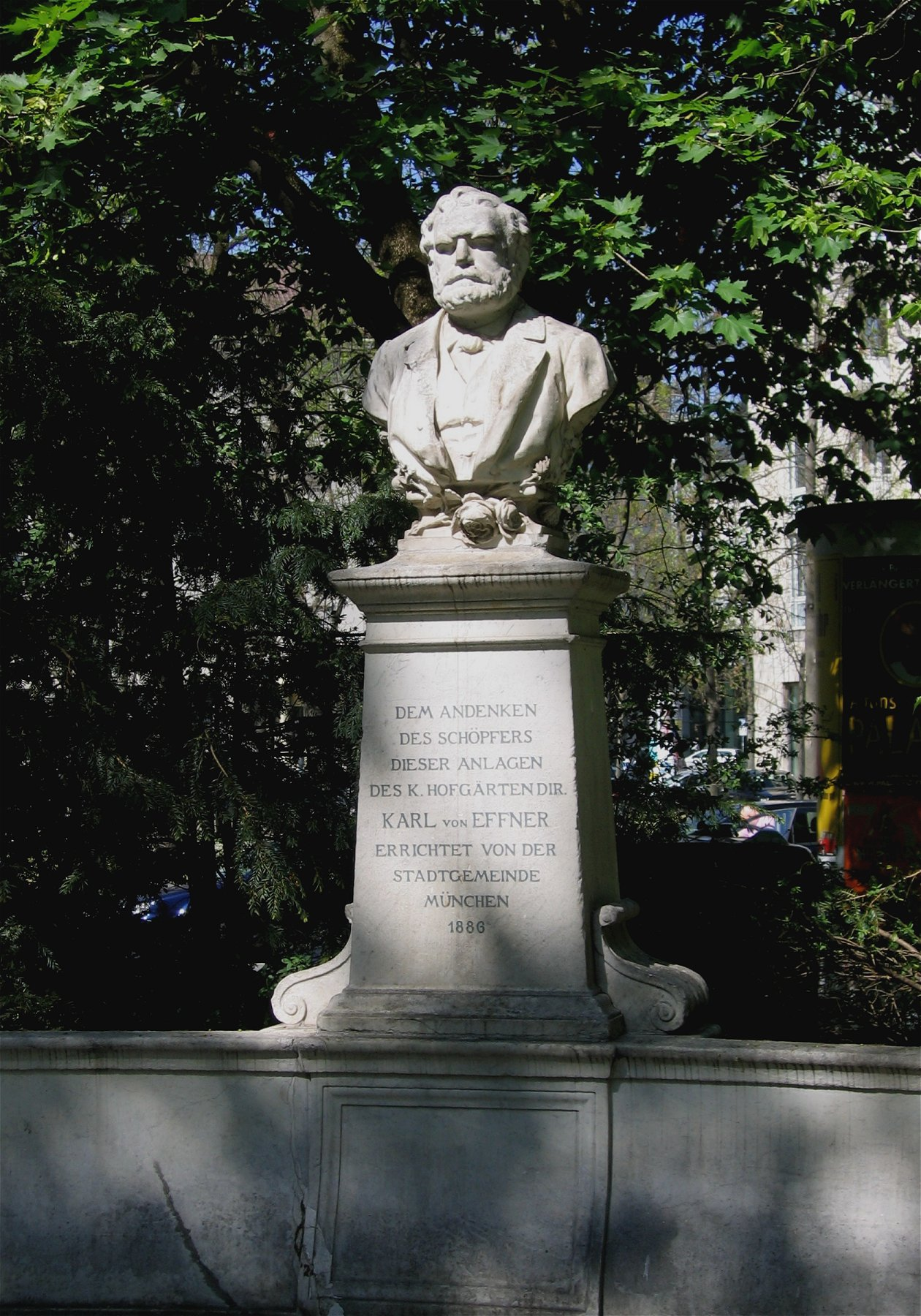
Monument of Carl von Effner in the Maximiliansplatz in Munich (by Wilhelm von Rümann)

He was born as Carl Effner in Munich, son of Carl Effner (the elder) (1791–1870), Senior Bavarian Court Gardener. After a gardening apprenticeship he made various study visits to Vienna, Paris, England and Sanssouci, where he also became familiar with the "mixed style" of garden design of the well-known Prussian landscape architect Peter Joseph Lenné involving the formation of regular areas of formal ornamental garden within wider areas of landscaped garden, which enjoyed a revival in the mid-19th century.

On these study trips he was accompanied by Max Kolb, the later Inspector of the Botanical Gardens, Nymphenburg.

In 1857 Maximilian II recalled him to Munich and at the early age of 26 appointed him Court Gardener. From 1860 to 1865 he was active as representative of the Senior Court Gardener on the staff of the Obersthofmarschall. Maximilian made Effner responsible for the landscaping of the banks of the Isar between Haidhausen and Bogenhausen (later known as the Maximiliansanlagen, or Maximilian Gardens) and for the garden element of the Maximilianstrasse designed by Friedrich Bürklein.

In 1868 Effner was appointed Head Court Gardener, and director of all Bavarian court gardens, by the Bavarian Regent Ludwig II.

In 1870 Ludwig II, by that time king, made Effner Royal Inspector of Court Gardens and in 1873 Royal Director of Court Gardens. He now designed the gardens for Ludwig II's castles, Neues Schloss, Herrenchiemsee, and Linderhof.

He also designed numerous private gardens in Bavaria.

He sometimes worked on the earlier gardens with his father.

In 1877 he was raised to the nobility (as von Effner). He died in Munich on 22 October 1884 and is buried in the Alter Südfriedhof (grave 13-1-34).

== Selected works ==
- Garden elements of the plans of Peter Joseph Lenné for the landscaped park at Feldafing on the west bank of the Starnbergersee, 1853-1863 (with his father)
- Park at Schloss Bernried, Bernried am Starnberger See (now owned by the Wilhelmina-Busch-Woods-Stiftung), c.1855
- Maximilian Gardens in Munich, 1856/57-1861, gardens of the Maximilianstrasse, and the Gasteig Gardens south of the Maximilianeum (now altered to form part of the Maximilian Gardens), 1861–66
- Historical restoration of the park of the Schleissheim Palace, 1865–68
- Park at the Dörnberg Palace in Regensburg, 1864-67 (with his father)
- Park at the Midgard-Haus in Tutzing (formerly known as the Tutzinger Seepark, now the Bagnères-de-Bigarre-Park) for the writer Maximilian Schmidt, presumably 1864-1870
- Spa park in Bad Reichenhall, 1868
- Enlargement of the park of Schloss Castell, c.1870
- Park of Schloss Linderhof, 1870/72-1880
- Completion of the garden of Schloss Tegernsee with carpet bedding, from 1872
- Siebentisch Park in Augsburg, from 1874
- Park of the Neues Schloss, Herrenchiemsee, plans of 1875/76, with an unfinished later remodelling; completed in a simplified form by his successor Jakob Möhl, in 1888
- Park of Schloss Schönau near Eggenfelden
- Park of Schloss Vornbach with rock grotto
- Park of Schloss Fürstenried in Munich (historical restoration in the style of the 18th century and also the creation of a new landscaped garden)

== Literature ==
- Tilo Richter: Carl von Effner und die Stadtgärtnerei Basel. In: ProgrammZeitung Basel. March 2011, p. 26 f. Accessed on 11 April 2011. (in German)
- Manfred Stephan: Biographien europäischer Gartenkünstler: Carl von Effner. Gartenkünstler im Dienste der Krone und des Bürgertums, in: Garten+Landschaft, vol. 5, 1998, pp. 347–355
- Lorenz Maier: Effner, Carl Joseph von. In: Karl Bosl (ed.): Bosls bayerische Biographie. Pustet, Regensburg 1983, ISBN 3-7917-0792-2, p. 165 (online on the website of the Universitätsbibliothek Regensburg). (in German)
- Carl von Effner: Bericht und Vorschläge über die Promenaden und Anlagen von Basel und Umgebung. Basel: J. J. Mast, 1860.
