= Dachau Palace =

Former residence of the rulers of Bavaria

Coordinates: 48°15′29″N 11°25′59″E

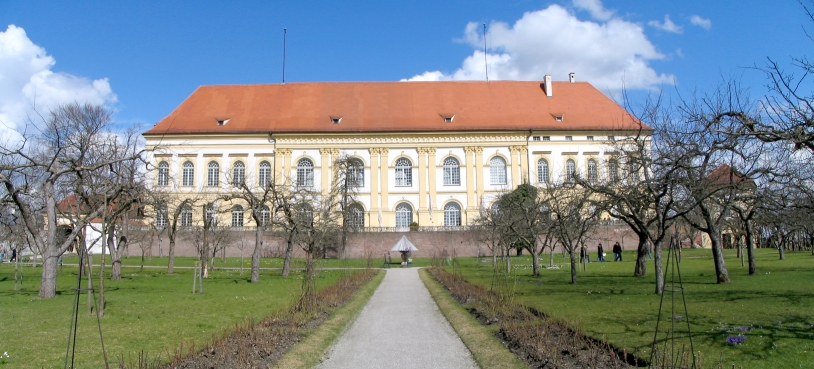
Dachau Palace

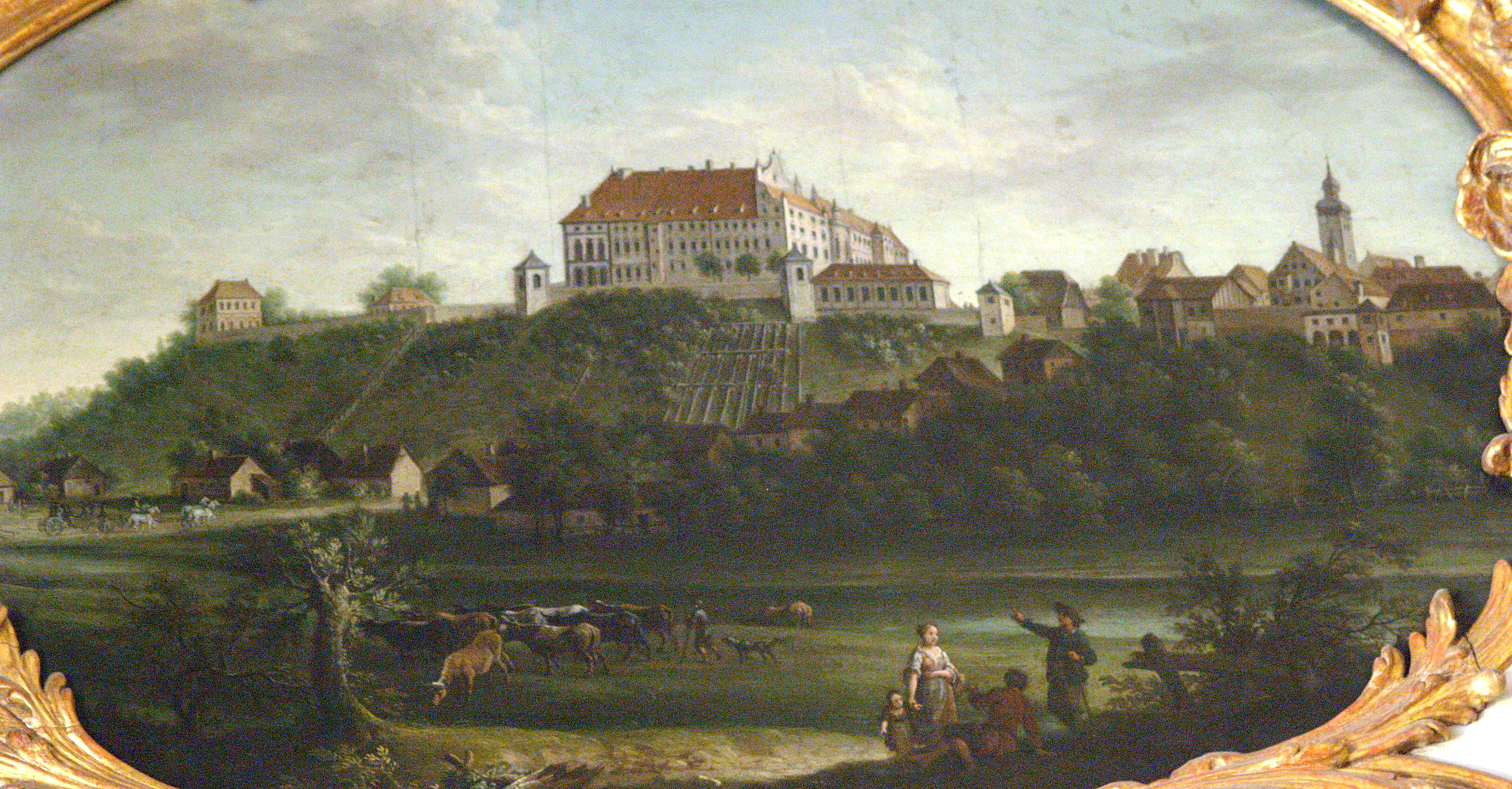
Dachau Palace, 1750

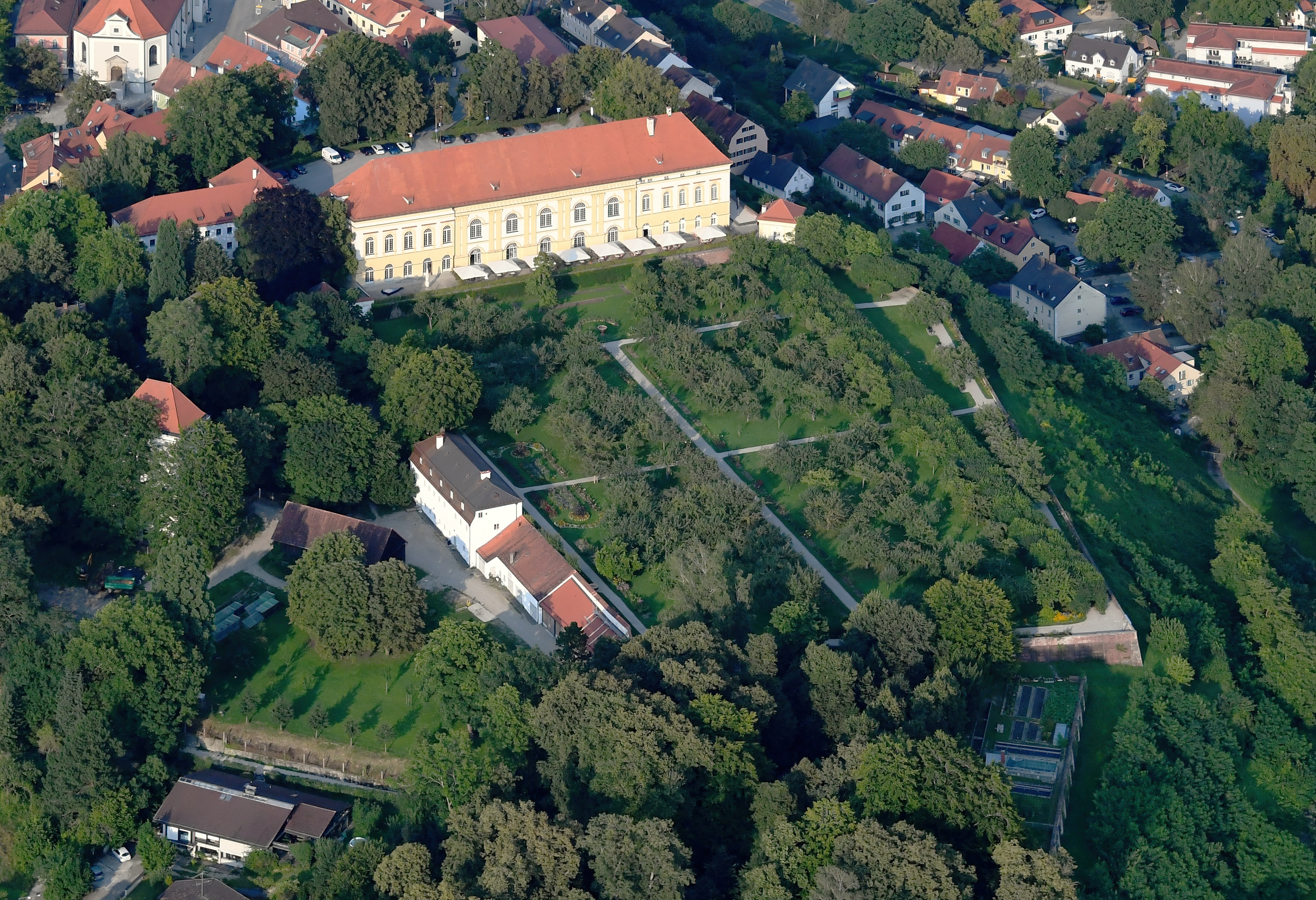
Aerial image of the Dachau palace and court garden

The Dachau Palace is a former residence of the rulers of Bavaria at Dachau, southern Germany.

== History ==
The castle was constructed around 1100 as a castle by the cadet branch of the House of Wittelsbach. In 1182, the last Count of Dachau, Konrad III, died without issue and Duke Otto I of Bavaria took possession of it shortly thereafter. The original castle was demolished between 1398 and 1403. In 1467, Sigismund, Duke of Bavaria resigned his rule of Bavaria-Munich and then kept only the new duchy of Bavaria-Dachau as his domain until his death in 1501.

William IV of Bavaria and his son Albert V ordered the construction of a Renaissance style four-wing palace with a court garden on the site of the old castle. The new building was designed by Heinrich Schöttl; construction began in 1546 and was completed in 1577. It later became the favoured residence of the rulers of Bavaria. Also, close to Dachau Palace was the Schleissheim Palace that started out with a Renaissance country house (1598) and hermitage founded by William V, Duke of Bavaria.

In 1715, Maximilian II Emanuel, Elector of Bavaria commissioned a redesign in Baroque style by Joseph Effner. The 60 wrought-iron parapet grilles on the facades have always been an essential accessory. The metalwork in six different patterns gives the magnificent facade its final touch. They were commissioned by Elector Max Emanuel and produced by Antoine Motté between 1724 and 1725. The design is attributed to Joseph Effner, while the models for the castings were made by the Flemish sculptor Guillielmus de Grof. Only the south-west wing is extant; King Maximilian I Joseph of Bavaria ordered the other 3 wings to be demolished in the early 19th century. They had suffered extensive damage at the hands of the Napoleonic troops.

== Description ==
The Palace is managed by the Bavarian Administration of State-owned Palaces, an administrative department of the Free State of Bavaria. It is open to visitors and the Banqueting Hall can be booked for special events. It is also used as a venue for classical concerts. The stairwell, same as the west facade of 1715 are built in the Régence style.

The main sight of the palace is the banqueting hall with its coffered Renaissance ceiling, designed and created between 1564 and 1566 by Hans Wisreutter, which was restored to the palace in 1977. The view from the top of the Schlossberg overlooks Munich and extends to the Bavarian Alps.

== The Park ==
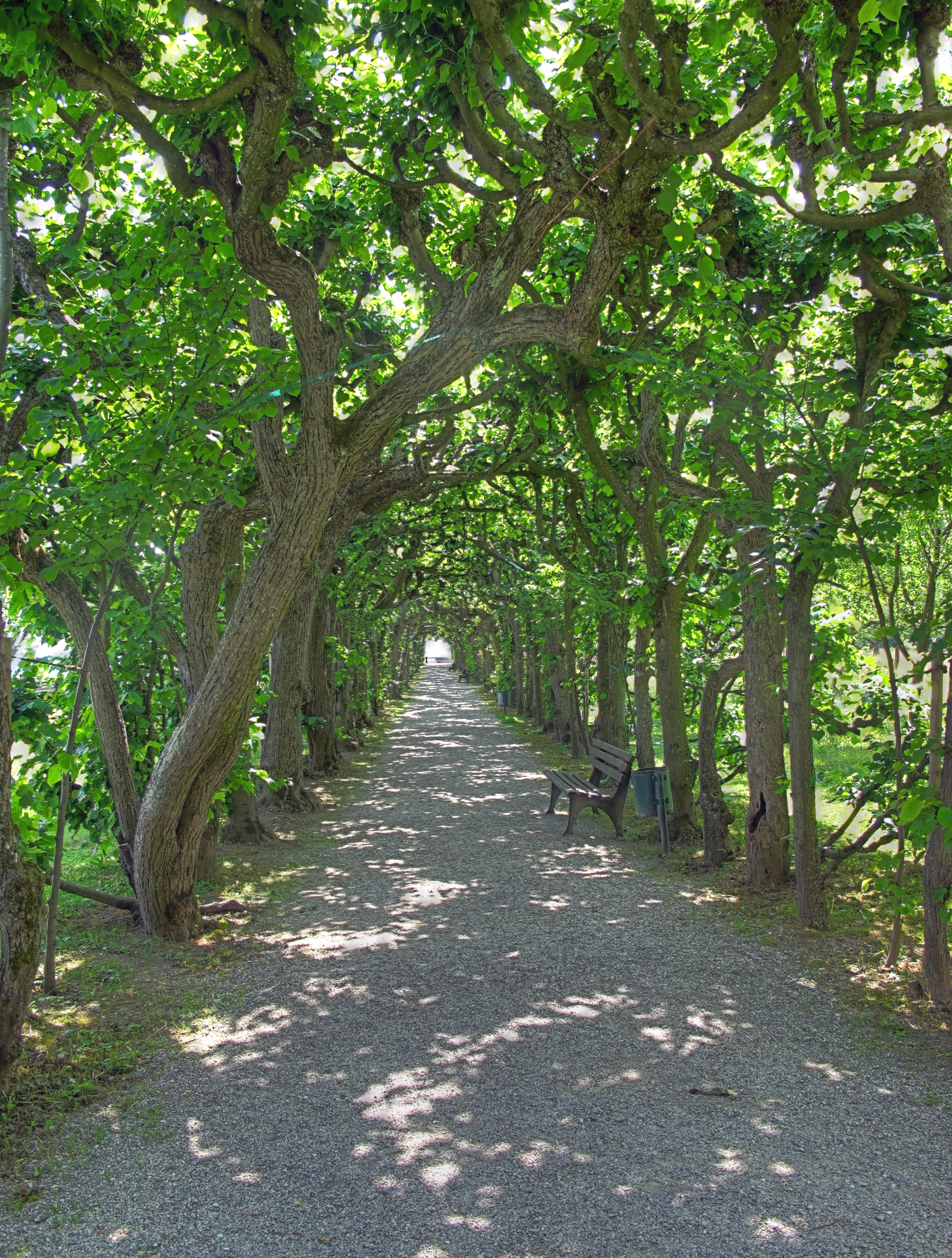
Lime trees in the court garden

The court garden was created from the 1572 in order to enjoy the remarkable view from the Schlossberg, several pavilions were built, of which three are still preserved. Comparable with the vineyard and famous Sanssouci Palace, were the "hanging gardens" of the Schlossberg: terraces with precious espalier fruits. For the upper part of the parterres a still existing balcony of lime trees was created. Joseph Effner re-designed together with his brother Johann Christoph Effner also the garden in Baroque style in 1717. As a representative of an enlightened absolutism, Elector Max III. Joseph ordered already in 1765 to develop an English landscape garden. Today, the lower part of the garden has been abandoned and is awaiting resurrection.

== See also ==
- List of Baroque residences
