= Peter Jacob Horemans =

Flemish painter

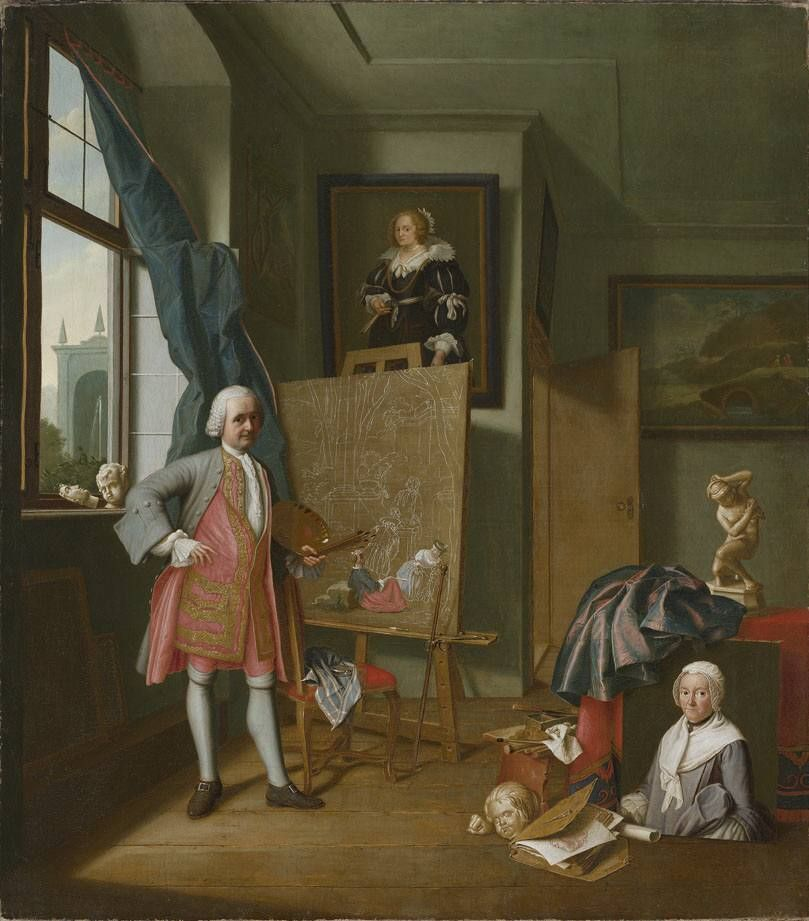
Self-portrait in the artist's atelier

Peter Jacob Horemans or Peter Jakob Horemans (25 October 1700 – 3 August 1776) was a Flemish painter of genre scenes, portraits, conversation pieces, still lives and city views. After training in Antwerp he was active in Germany where he became court painter. He was a versatile artist who worked in many genres and for a variety of aristocratic, religious and private patrons.

== Life ==
Horemans was born in Antwerp on 25 October 1700 as the son of Jan Josef, a notary, and Maria Magdalena Lowies and baptised on 26 October of the same year. He was registered in 1716 in the records of the Antwerp Guild of Saint Luke as the pupil of his older brother Jan Josef, a painter of small genre pictures that were highly prized on the market.

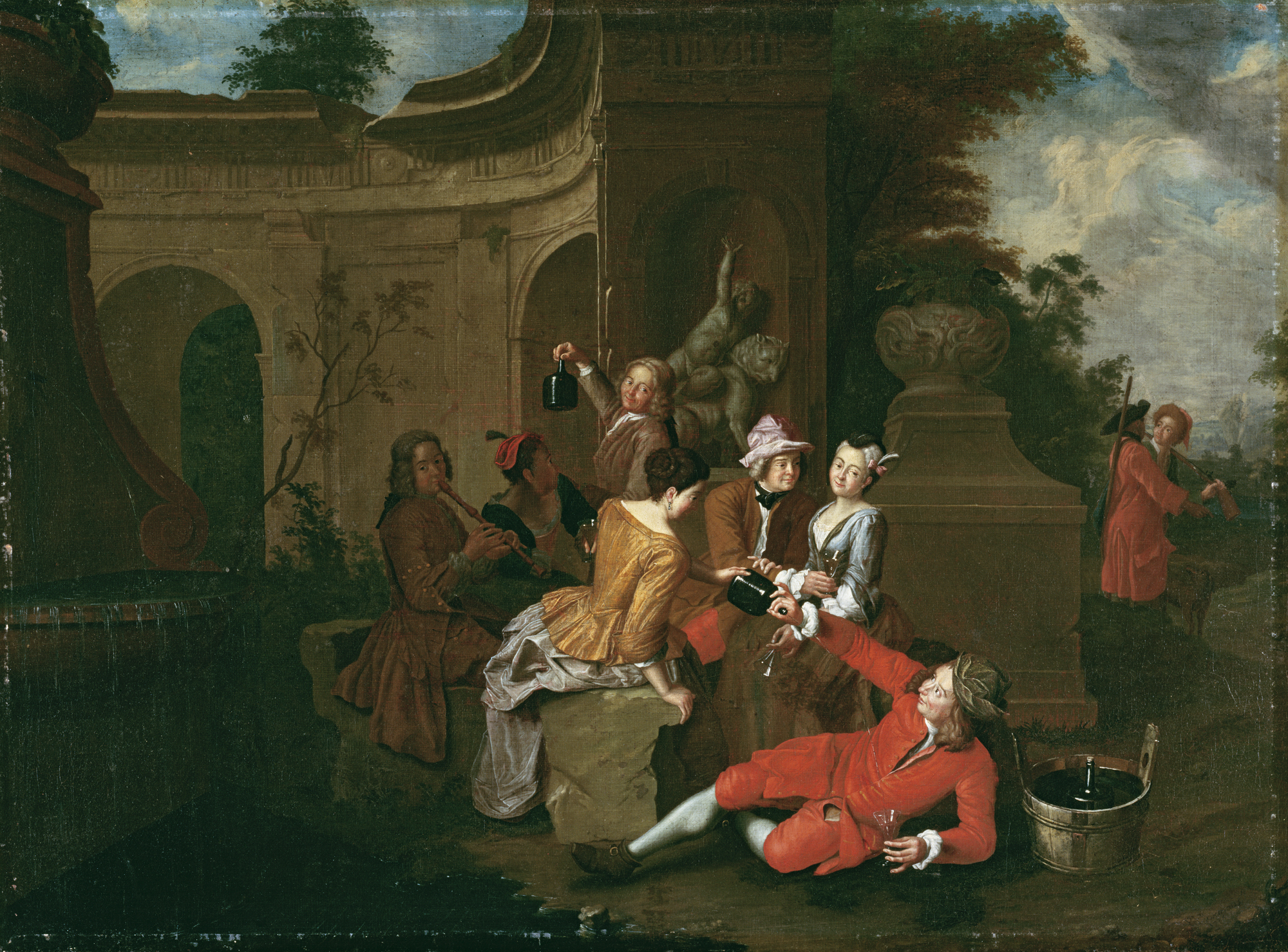
Picnic in the park

Instead of registering as a master in the Antwerp Guild, Horemans left his hometown on 30 April 1724 to travel to Rome in Italy to further his studies. He was accompanied on this trip by the Antwerp painter Jan Baptist Verhaegen (or Verhaghen). They travelled via Frankfurt and arrived in 1725 in Munich, where they decided to stay. They initially shared a home with the Guillielmus de Grof (Willem de Grof), the Flemish court sculptor who was then living in the Herzog-Max-Burg. The two painters decided to stay in Munich for three years to complete a series of small-scale paintings for the Kunstkammer of de Grof He became in 1727 court painter to prince-elector of Bavaria Charles Albrecht, who would be the Emperor Charles VII, Holy Roman Emperor from 1740 to 1745. He made decorations in the prince-elector's Nymphenburg Palace and hunting lodge Amalienburg, two buildings completed during Charles VII's reign at the height of the Rococo in Bavaria.

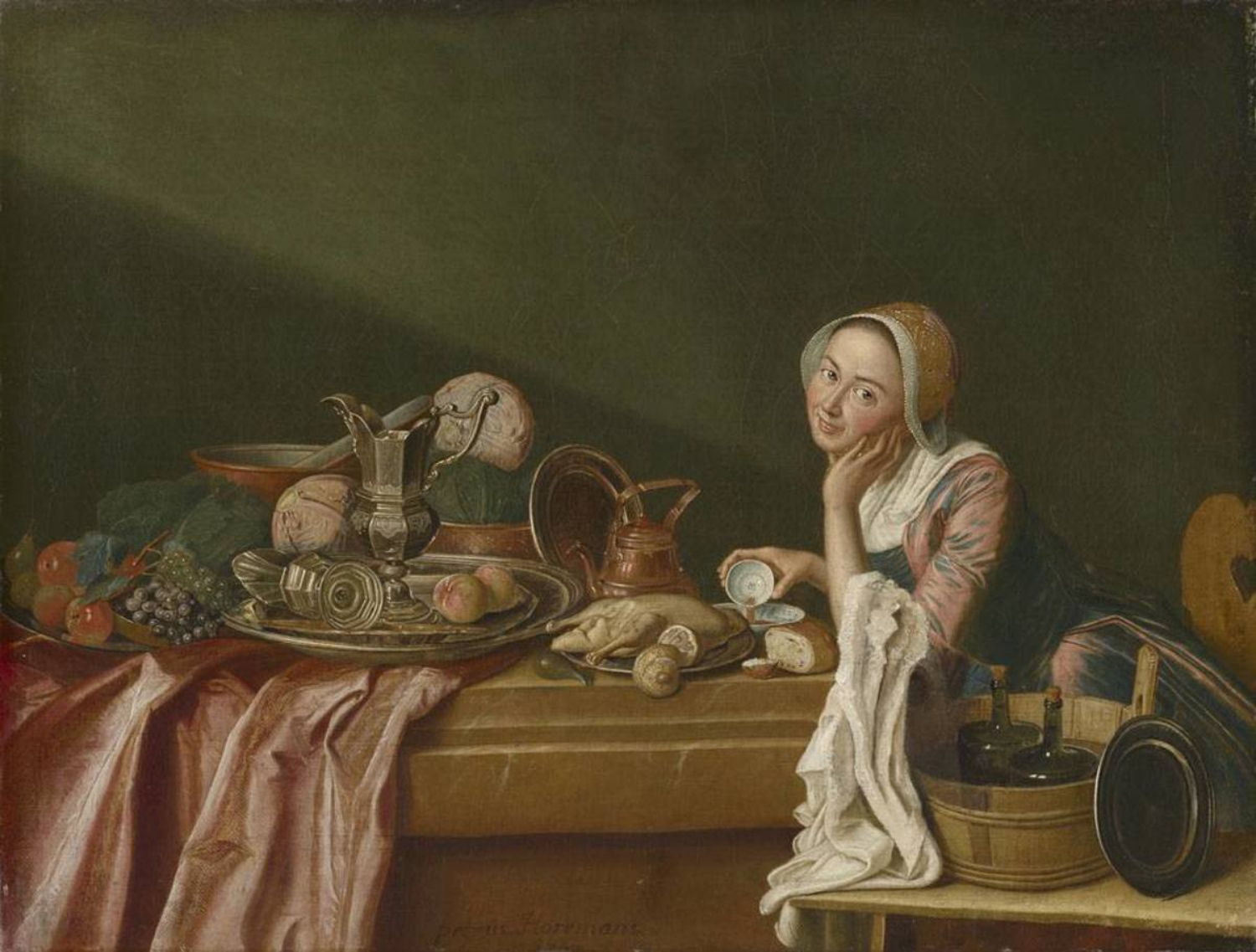
A lady at a table laden with food

His nephew Frans Karel (Franz Karl) Horemans worked after 1725 in his workshop in Munich. On 4 June 1730 he married Justina Magdalena Resch, daughter of the table decker of the prince-elector. His artist friends the court sculptors Guillielmus de Grof and Gilles Fareslitz attended the wedding. In 1759 he became court painter to Maximilian III Joseph, the subsequent Elector of Bavaria. In 1765 he qualified as a master in Munich. The Nuremberg painter Magnus Prasch was his pupil.

In his final years his eyesight deteriorated to the point that he could no longer paint. Horemans died in Munich.

== Work ==
He was a versatile artist who painted a wide range of subject, including portraits, landscapes, genre scenes, conversation pieces, city views and still lifes. He worked for various aristocratic, religious and private patrons.

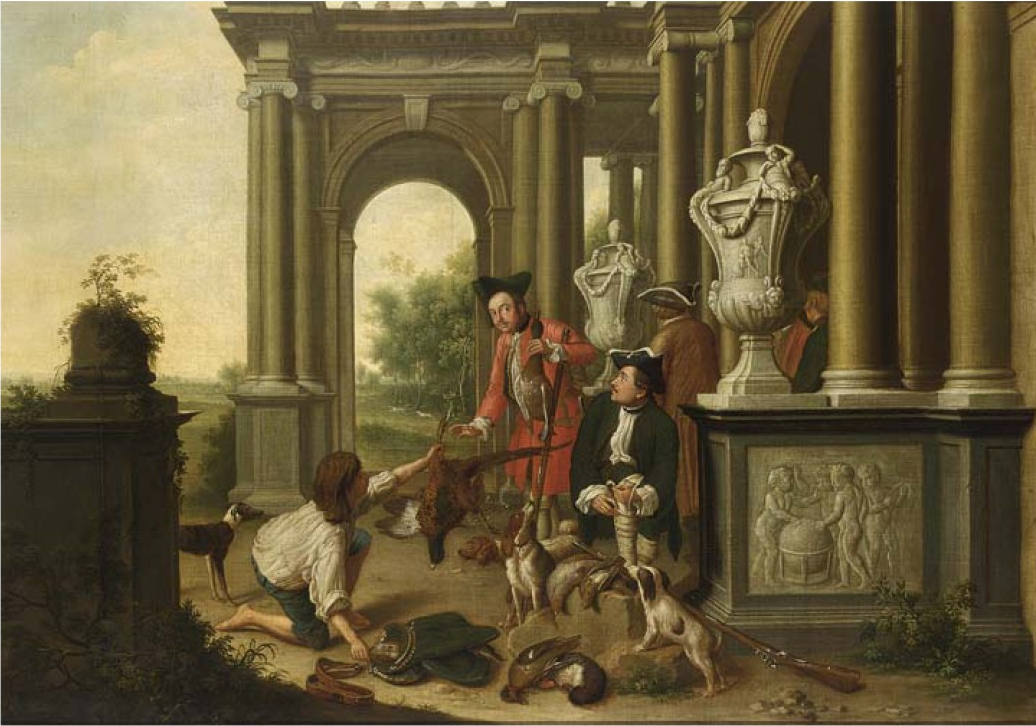
The failed hunt, a young poacher offering a pheasant to two sportsmen

His works provide an interesting record of everyday life in Munich in a light hearted Rococo style. In particular, he left a chronicle of life at the Bavarian court and of the local aristocracy through his numerous portraits and genre pieces. He documented court concerts, carousel races, hunting parties, outdoor dinner parties and lovers' trysts. His elegant scenes are often set on a terrace of an imposing building in classical style and decorated with sculptures. These sculptures were painted after plaster studio models of the artist which re-appear in many of his paintings. The terrace serves as a stage for the action depicted in the picture. Many of these works can be regarded as conversation pieces and call to mind the fête galantes of French Rococo artists such as Antoine Watteau. He made many individual portraits of the members of the court as well as of other artists such as painters, sculptors and musicians. For the Amalienburg he painted more than 200 portraits.

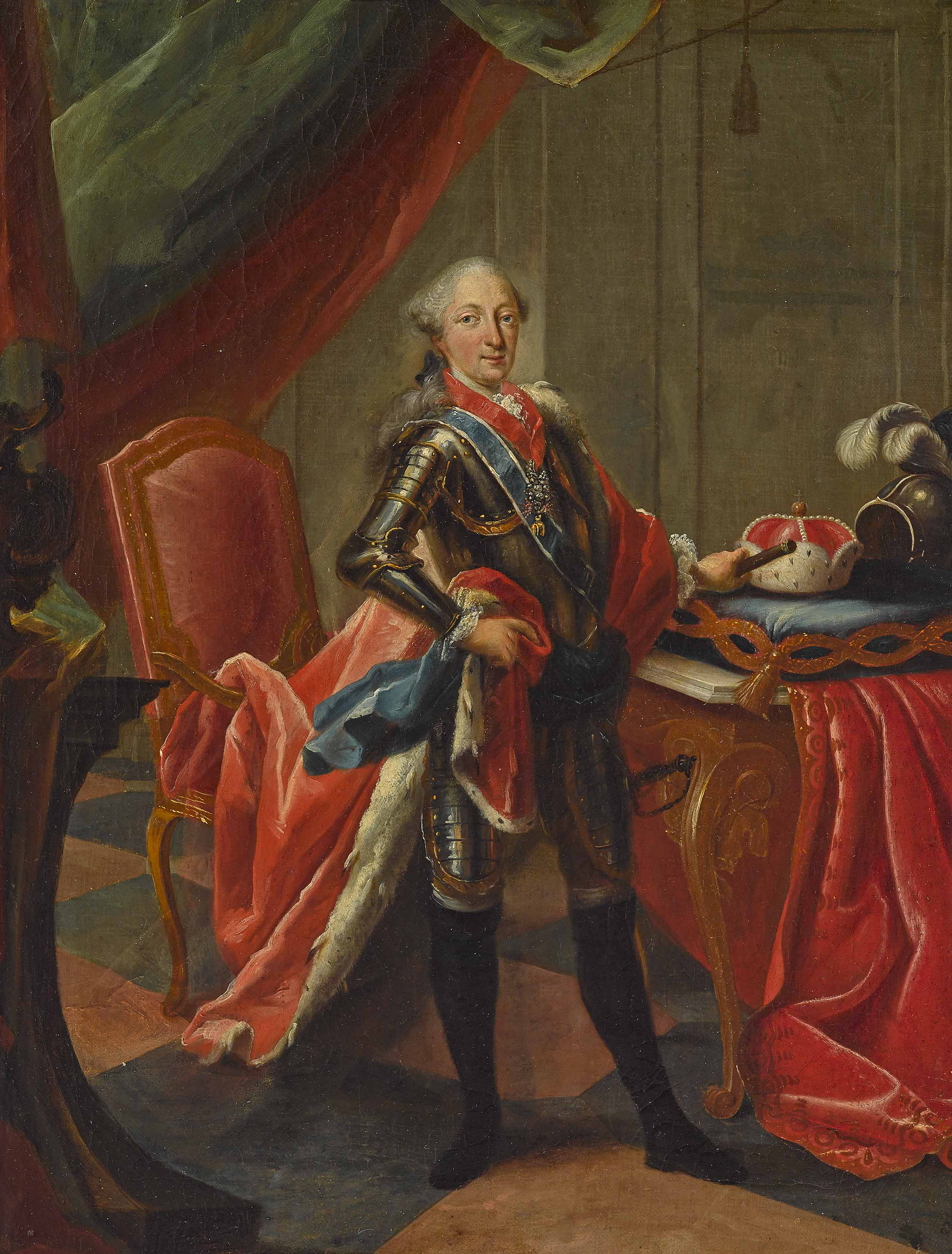
Portrait of Maximilian III Joseph

He made a series of paintings of the hunts of the Prince Elector for Amalienburg, the Elector's hunting lodge.

Horemans was a prolific painter of still lifes, including still lifes of hunting trophies, fruit, vegetables, kitchen utensils and musical instruments. He placed his still lifes often in an interior or against a grey background resting on a table at which a pretty young woman is seated. It is known that his courtly patrons were fond of images of young women.

An example of his religious paintings is the series of the Seven gifts of the Holy Spirit which he painted around 1753 for the Catholic Heilig-Geist-Kirche in Munich. In the series of 7 wall paintings (one of which was destroyed during World War II), the seven gifts of the Holy Spirit are represented by young women with various attributes.
