= Fürstenried Palace =

Building in Munich, Germany

Coordinates: 48°05′39″N 11°29′14″E

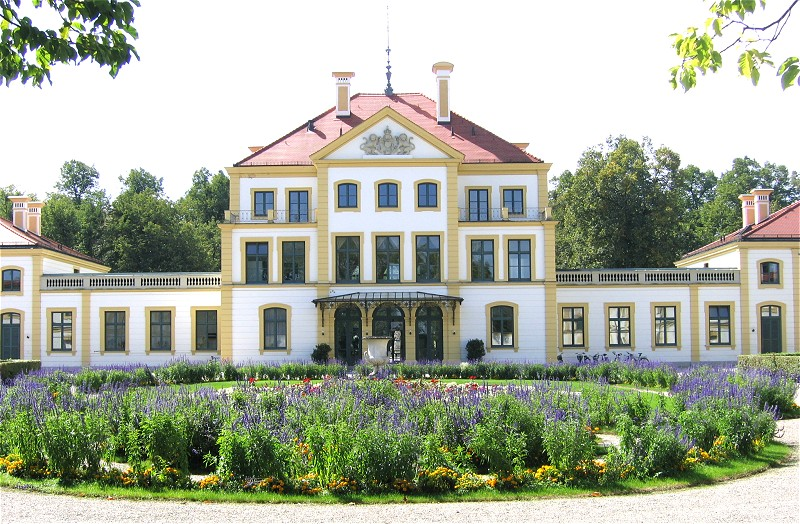
Fürstenried Palace.

Fürstenried Palace is a Baroque maison de plaisance and hunting lodge in Munich, Germany. It was built from 1715 to 1717 for Elector Maximilian II Emanuel. Today the palace serves as spiritual house for archdiocese and as pastoral center.

== History ==
It was built by Joseph Effner for Elector Maximilian II Emanuel in 1715–17 as a hunting lodge and maison de plaisance. It was the extension and modification of an already existing noble mansion.

In 1726 a fire damaged the Fürstenried Palace. The following year, at the birth of the future Maximilian III Joseph, Fürstenried went as puerperal gift to the Princess Maria Amalia of Austria, the wife of the son of Maximilian Emanuel, Elector Charles Albert. From 1777 to 1797 Fürstenried Palace was the residence of the former Electress Maria Anna of Saxony, the widow of Maximilian III Joseph. In September 1796, Munich was surrounded by the French Republican Army that fought against the Austro-Imperial forces. Here, the Fuerstenried castle was plundered. In 1798 the palace temporarily became an asylum for French Tappistines,

With the introduction of compulsory schooling in Bavaria, King Maximilian Joseph I. allowed to use an adjoining building of the castle as the first schoolhouse for the surrounding villages of Forstenried and Großhadern between 1805 and 1824. During the German war in 1866 and the Franco-German war 1870/71 the castle was used as a military hospital. The palace served as domicile for the ill King Otto of Bavaria from 1883 until his death in 1916. The King lived in an elegantly furnished apartment on the ground floor, while his servants lived on the first floor. After the First World War, the castle served as a military hospital again. Since 1925 the Catholic Retreat Hostel for spiritual exercises has been housed in Fürstenried Palace. Only the surrounding wall friezes of the Blue Cabinet on the second floor of the main building have been preserved from the interiors.

During the Second World War the palace again served as military hospital. War From 1946 to 1949 the castle was used as accommodation of the Theological Faculty of LMU Munich and the Georgianum. Pope Benedict XVI, who was student of the faculty, has said that, prior to his ordination as a deacon in the fall of 1950, he pondered his vocation to the priesthood "as I walked in the beautiful park of Fürstenried ... ."

From 1972 to 1976 the palace was modernized. Since 2013 Jesuit Padre Christoph Kentrup leads the palace.

=== Construction ===
The palace has a manorial driveway, which links Fürstenried Palace and Nymphenburg Palace. The palace is a three-storey main building and has two lateral smaller pavilions as well as several adjoining buildings around a court of honor.

== The park ==
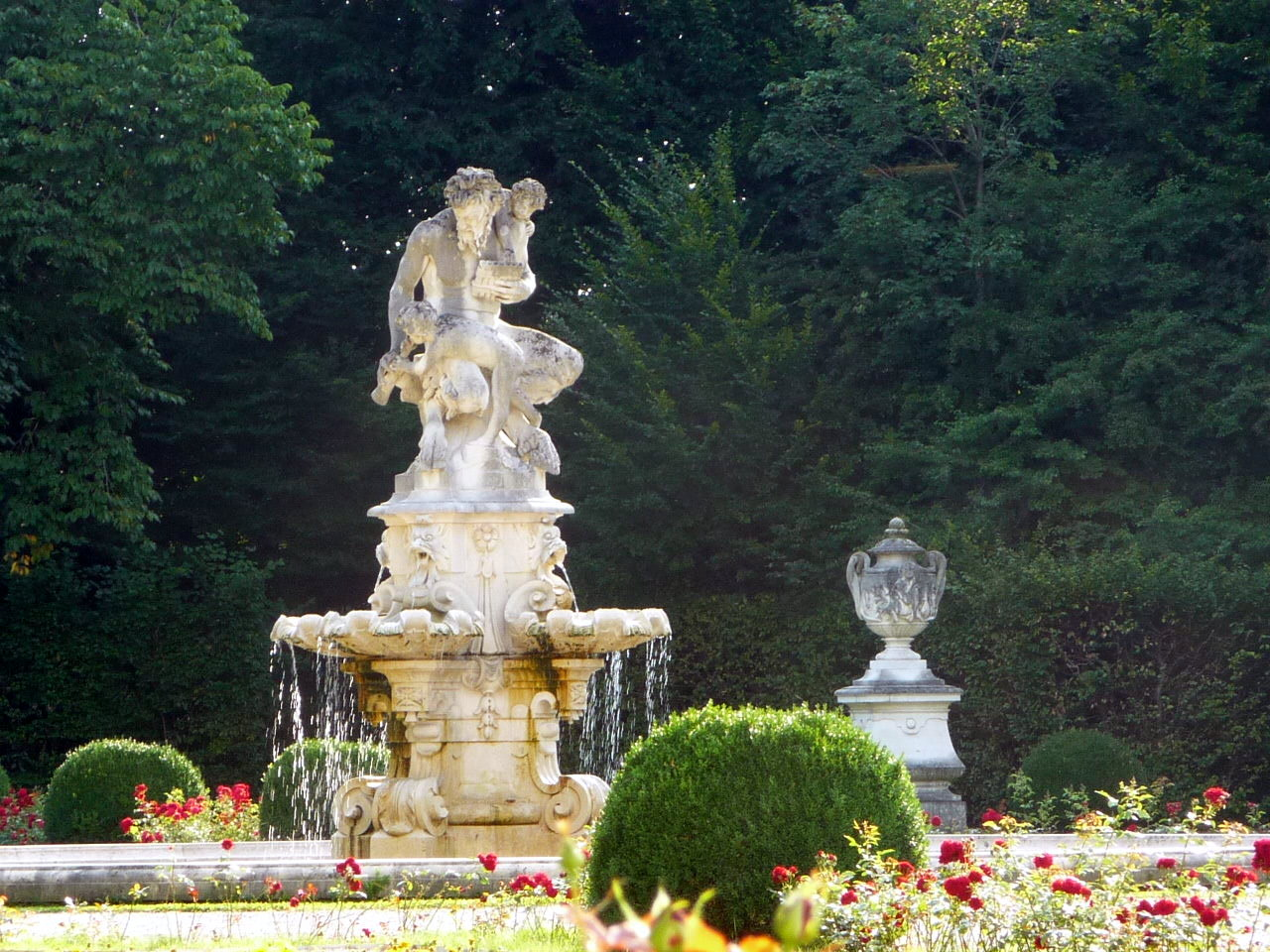
The fountain sculpture of a faun adorns the baroque part of the park

Already in the 18th century high-quality vegetables and dessert fruit was produced in the fruit and vegetable garden of the palace. The court gardener excelled in the arts, in addition to the everyday to also use rare fruit and vegetables such as asparagus, artichokes, quinces and peaches. The then-popular beans and peas were grown in cold frames almost all year round. This tradition was resumed in King Otto's time. The Baroque garden behind the castle was then reconstructed by Carl von Effner, according to the plans of his ancestor Joseph Effner. Carl von Effner's great merit is to preserve the 110 lime trees in the park and many more along the two double-row alleys flanking the line of sight towards Munich. In the 20th century the palace was famous for its foreign plants.

== See also ==
- List of Baroque residences
