= Joseph Effner =

German architect and decorator

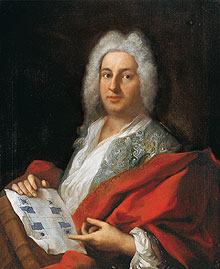
Joseph Effner

Joseph Effner (February 4, 1687 (baptized) – February 23, 1745) was a German architect and decorator.

== Biography ==
Effner was born in Dachau as a son of the court gardener Christian Öffner. Effner accompanied the elector of Bavaria Max Emanuel to Bruxelles. In 1706 Effner was retrained by Gabriel Germain Boffrand in Paris. Here he changed his family name to "Effner". In 1717 Effner was sent by the elector to Italy for a study trip. From 1715 to 1726 Effner was then court architect to the elector. Joseph Effner introduced modern French ideas of architecture to the Munich court. After the death of Enrico Zuccalli in 1724 he received even more competences. With the accession to power of Charles Albert in 1726 Effner was replaced by his pupil François de Cuvilliés and then worked in the administration. He died in Munich.

== Training ==
Effner studied architecture under the famous French architect Germain Boffrand. The latter made a deep impression on Effner's style. It was this training that led to his introducing French designs upon his return to Germany with the Elector.

== Designs ==
As chief court architect, Effner worked on the Elector's residences in Munich. He made several changes to these buildings. His work on the Nymphenburg Palace is regarded as his best. He increased the palace's size. He also added three pavilions, an octagonal Chinese pagoda, a ruined hermit's cell, and a tiled bathhouse.

== Chief Works ==
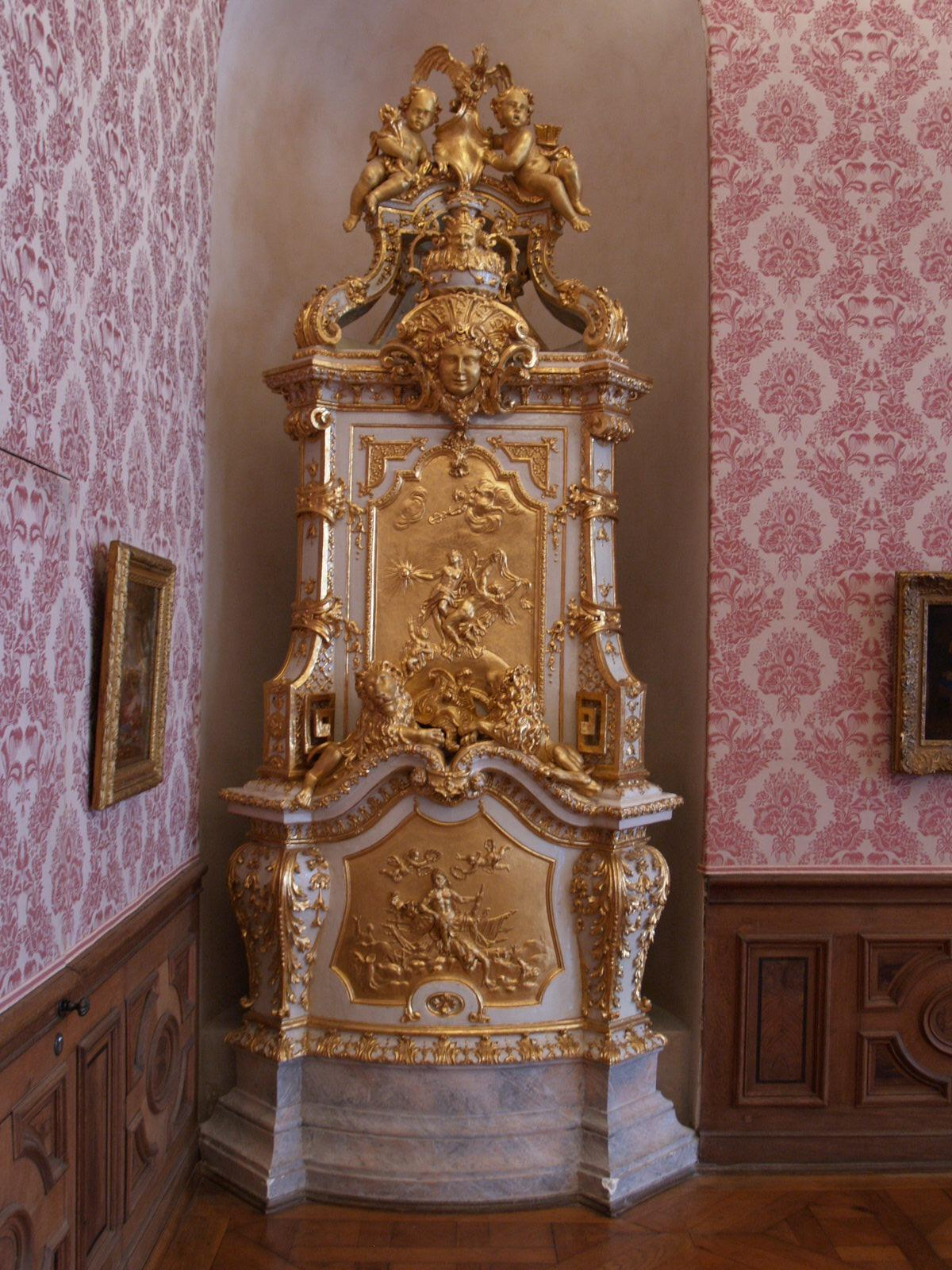
Cocklestove by Joseph Effner, Schleissheim Palace (ca. 1720)

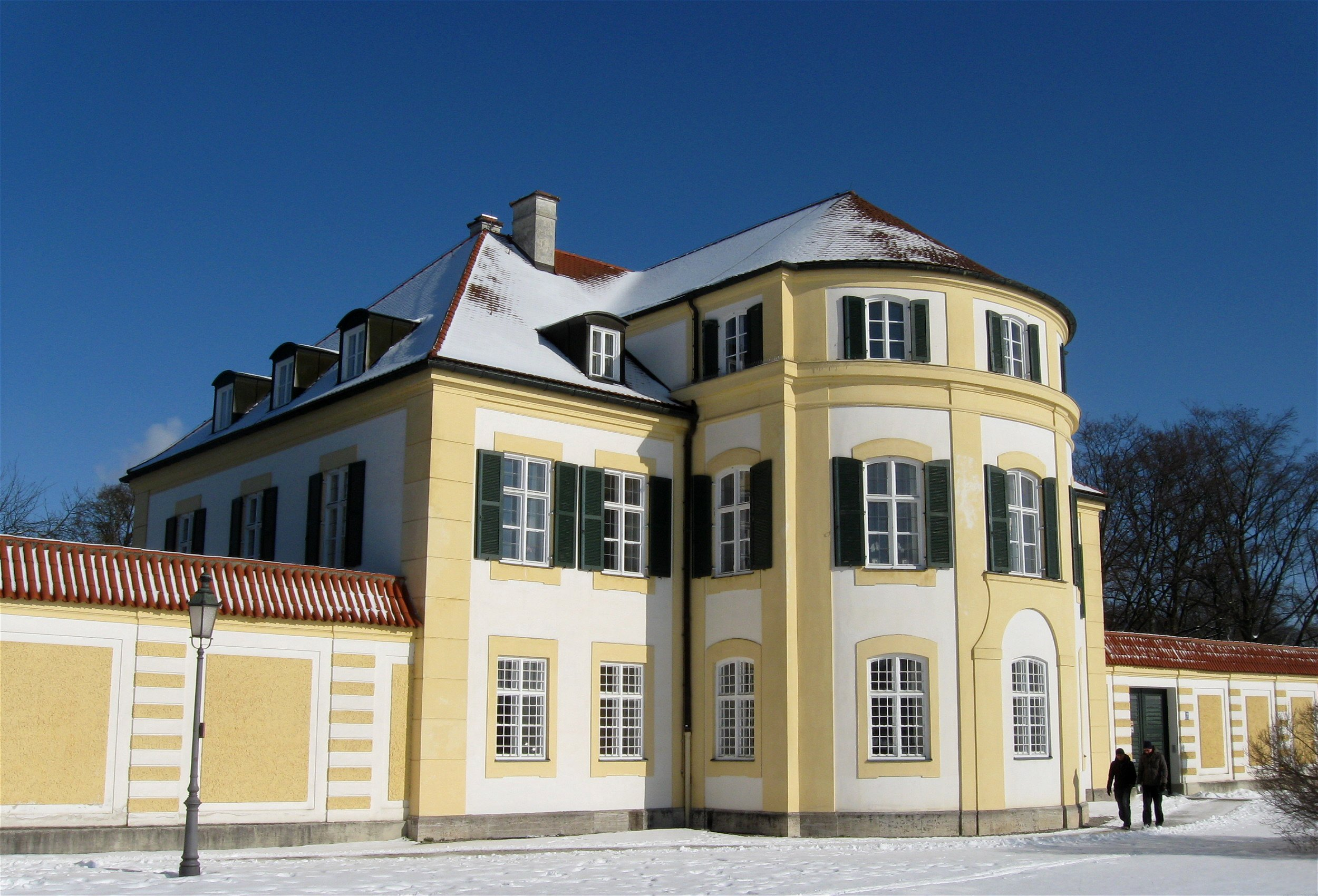
One of Effner's designs, Kavaliershäuschen – cavalier's lodge Nymphenburg Palace.

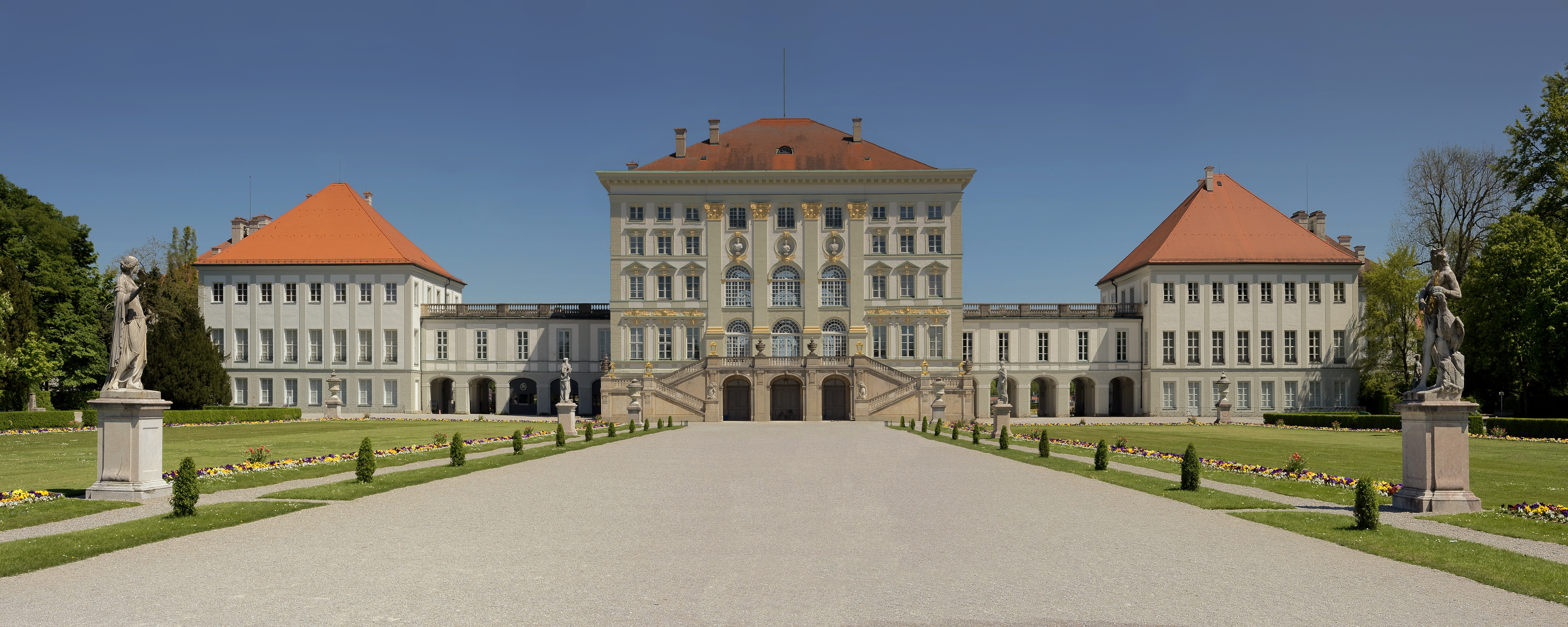
The Nymphenburg Palace

- Upgrading of Dachau Palace (1715–1717)
- Fürstenried Palace in Munich (1715–1717)
- Expansion of the Park and Palace of Nymphenburg and construction of the Pagodenburg teahouse (1716–1719) and the Badenburg bathing house (1718–1721)
- Expansion of Schleissheim Palace (1719–1726)
- Construction of the Reiche Zimmer (Rich Rooms) in the Munich Residence
- Palais Preysing in Munich (1723–1729)
