= Guillielmus de Grof =

Flemish sculptor, metal caster, stucco maker, frame maker and cabinet maker

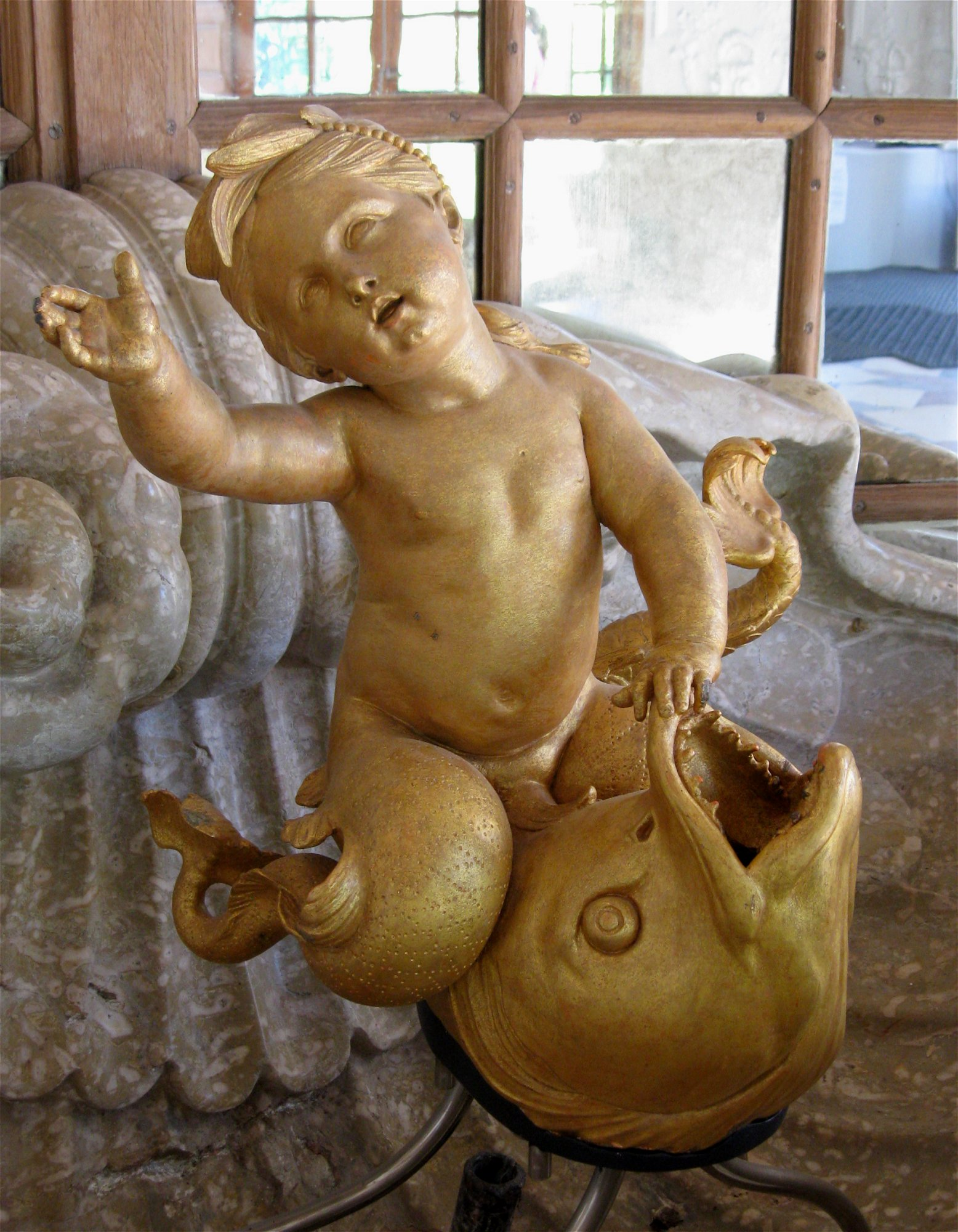
Triton's children riding dolphins, 1722, Brandenburg, Nymphenburg Palace Park

Guillielmus de Grof or Willem or Wilhelm de Grof (Antwerp, baptized on 13 November 1676 – Munich, 15 February 1759) was a Flemish sculptor, metal caster, stucco maker, frame maker and cabinet maker. After training in Antwerp he worked in Paris and Munich as court sculptor. In Paris he was a court sculptor to King Louis XIV and in Munich he was employed by the Elector Maximilian II Emanuel of Wittelsbach. He is known for his large scale equestrian portraits as well as small scale decorative sculptures. He was one of the great pioneers of Rococo art in Munich. His style combined the court style of Louis XIV with the exuberant Flemish Baroque, which had its roots in Rubens' works. He had an important influence on the development of sculpture in Bavaria and Vienna.

== Life ==
Guillielmus de Grof was born in Antwerp as the son of Guillielmus and Anna Bulens. He was baptized on 13 November 1676. His father was a cartwright, originally from Grimbergen who had settled in Antwerp around 1670. Guillielmus received his artistic training from the Antwerp sculptor Frans Biddeloo and was registered as his pupil in the Antwerp Guild of Saint Luke in the guild year 1688–1689. There is no record of de Grof becoming a master in the Guild of Saint Luke.

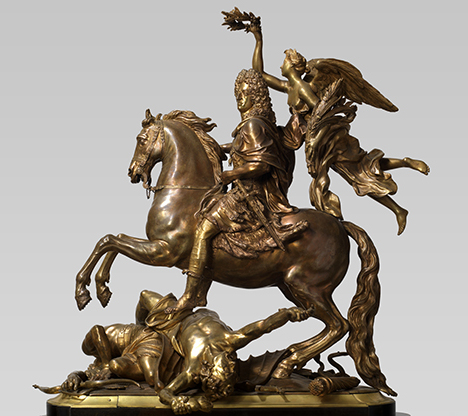
Apotheosis of Maximilian II Emanuel

He continued his training in Paris, where he is recorded from 1700, and possibly also in Italy. From 1708 he was in the service of King Louis XIV in Paris. He married the Alsatian woman Rosalia Susanna Lamoureux. Of the couple's children are known: Charles (1712–1774), Claudius Achilles (b. 1716), Ferdinand Wilhelm (b. 1718) and Johanna Margaretha.

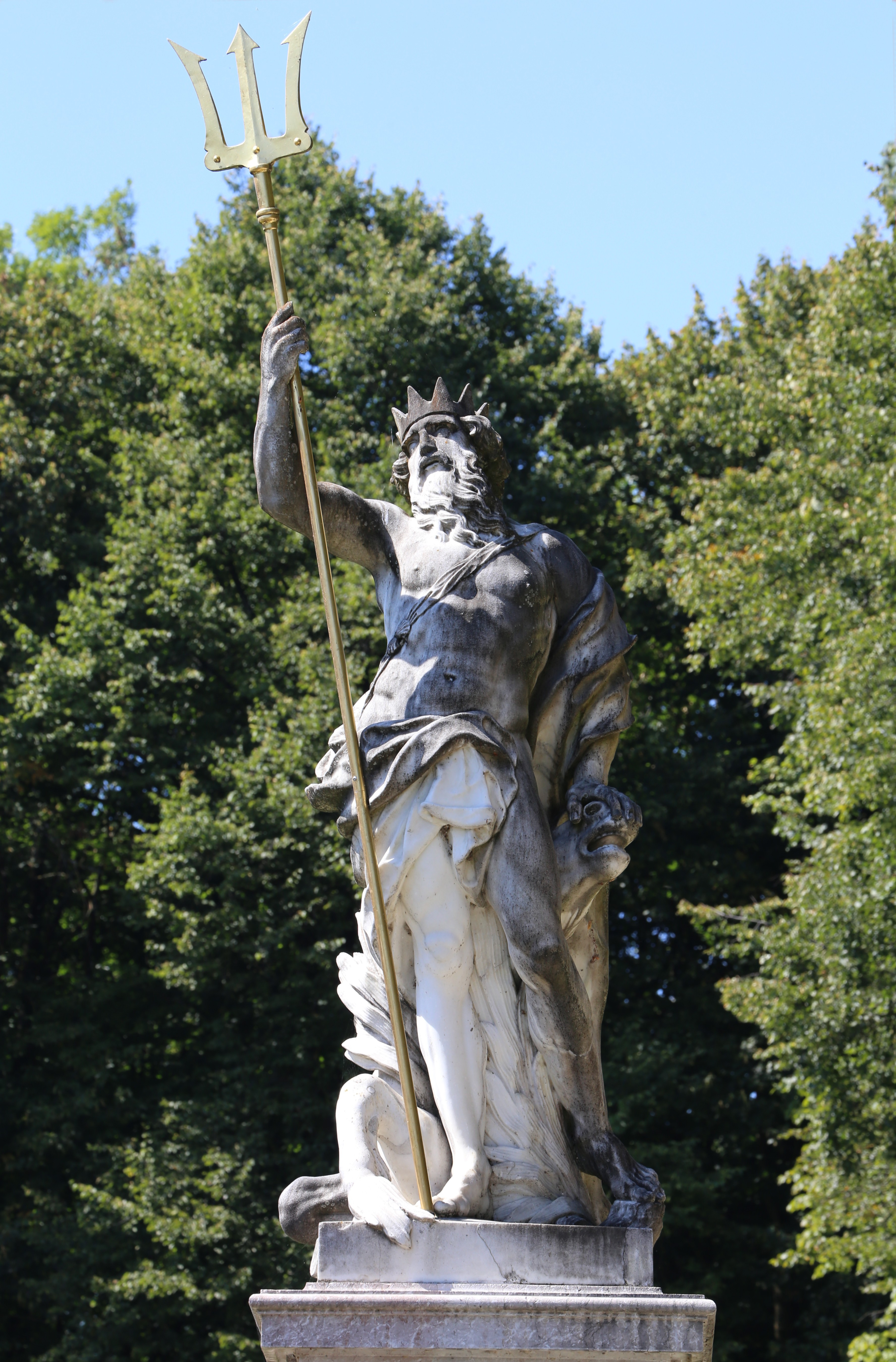
Neptune, Nymphenburg

In 1714 he created the impressive bronze Apotheosis of Maximilian II Emanuel, Elector of Bavaria (Bavarian National Museum, inv. no. R3973) for Maximilian Emanuel II who was at that time living in exile in Paris. He entered the employ of Maximilian Emanuel on 1 September 1714. In 1715, he was appointed by Maximilian Emanuel, who by that time had returned to Munich, as his court sculptor. De Grof set up a "state studio" in the Herzog-Max-Burg. It became a large workshop, which employed 14 journeymen and had a foundry. He worked on many of the commissions of Maximilian Emanuel including the now lost lead garden sculptures for the Nymphenburg Palace and the Schleißheim Palace. He provided decorations for the gardens of the various residences of the Elector. The Elector employed many other artists and spent massive sums on his construction projects leading to a large state debt. He was unable to pay his debts, including the commissions made by de Grof. This caused de Grof to suffer financial problems towards the end of his life.

A highly celebrated artist, he died as an imperial councilor in Munich. His eldest son Charles succeeded him as court sculptor in Munich.

== Works ==
De Grof was a versatile sculptor who worked in many materials including marble, wood and stucco and as active as a metal sculptor, wax sculptor, caster, stucco maker, frame maker and cabinet maker. His style combined the court style of Louis XIV with the exuberant Flemish Baroque, which had its roots in Rubens' work.

De Grof produced many bronze objects as well as a few marble sculptures such as the Neptune at Nymphenburg dated 1737. As he was in charge of the overall decoration of the architectural projects of Maximilian Emanuel, he made stucco ceilings such as in the stair-well in the Dachau Palace dated to the period 1716–1717. He also worked in silver. Several of his preparatory drawings exist.
