= Jan Josef Horemans the Elder =

Flemish painter (1682–1759)

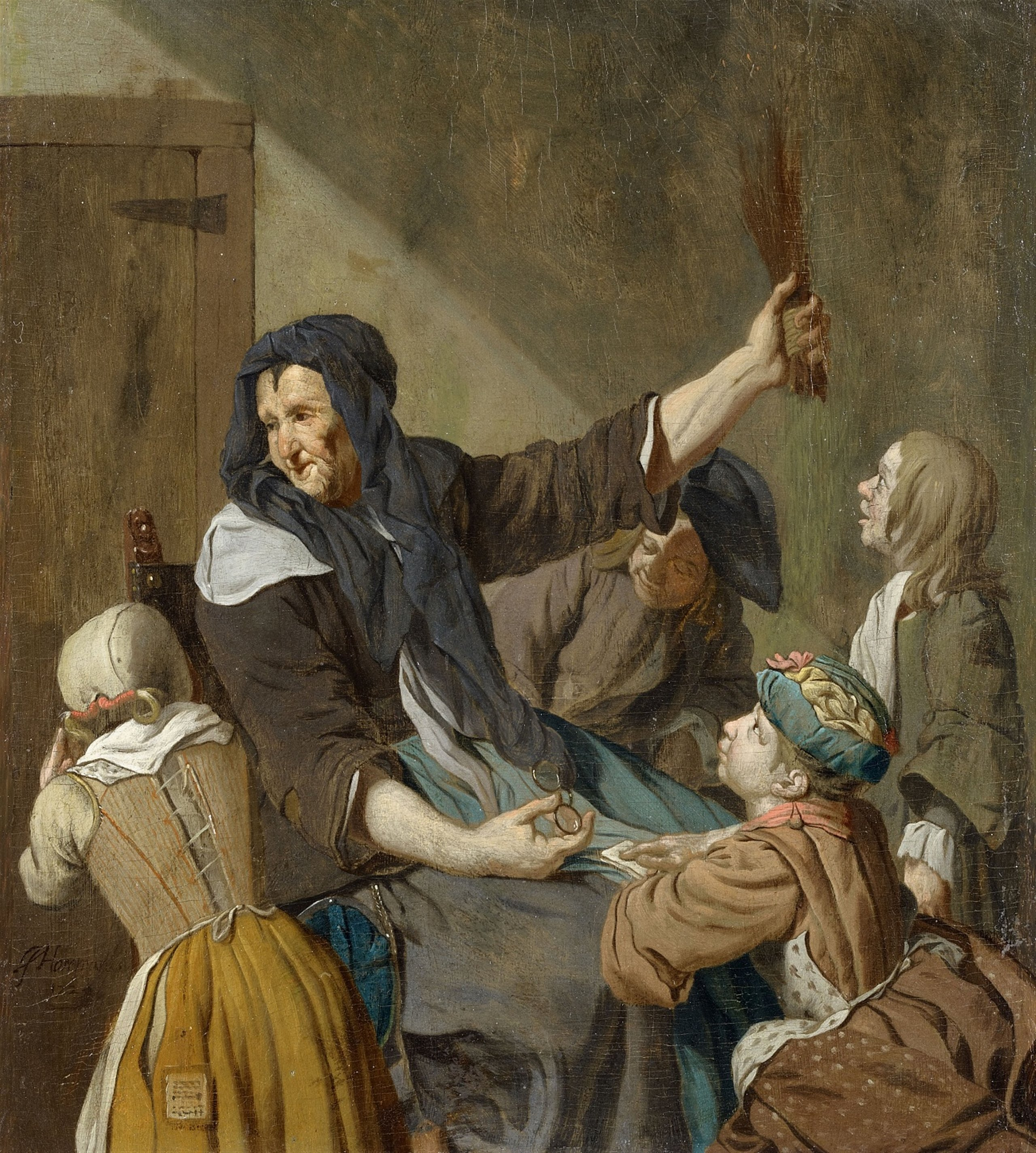
The lesson

Jan Josef Horemans the Elder (1682–1759) was a Flemish painter of the 18th century. He was mainly known for his genre scenes but he also painted portraits and historical allegories.

== Life ==
He was born in Antwerp. He was registered at the Antwerp Guild of Saint Luke as a pupil of the sculptor Michiel van der Voort the Elder in the guild year 1694-95 and later of the painter Jan van Pee.

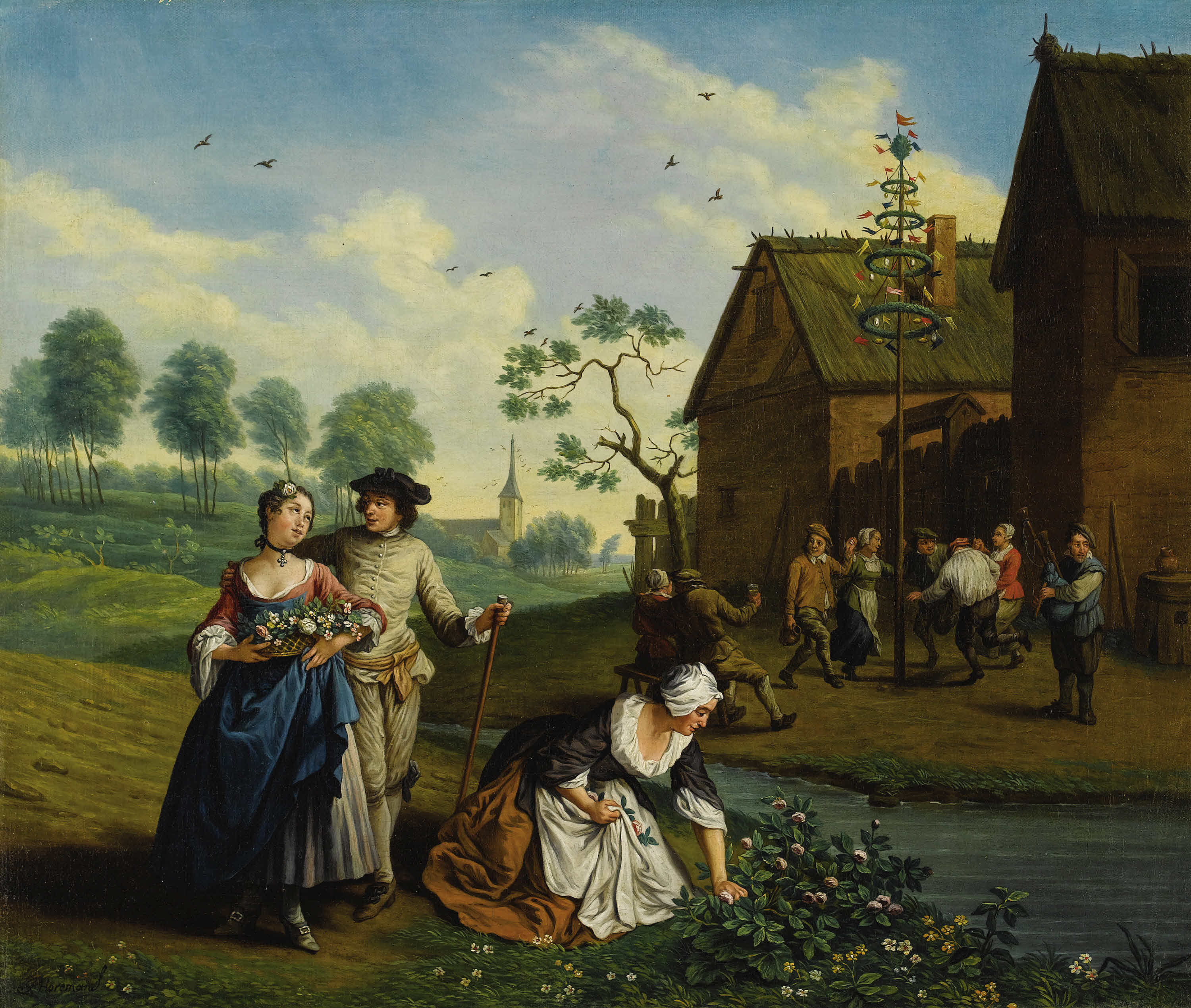
Spring

In 1706 he became master in the Antwerp Guild of St. Luke. The next year he married Maria Francisca van der Voort, the daughter of his first master Michiel van der Voort the Elder. Their son Jan Josef Horemans the Younger also became a painter.

He was the teacher of his younger brother Peter Jacob and his son Jan Josef. He died in Antwerp.

== Work ==
He is known for portraits, genre works, and historical allegories. He produced large number of small anecdotal pictures that were executed in the tradition of 17th-century Flemish genre painters. His colours were rather dark and he was later nicknamed 'le brun' and 'le sombre' to distinguish him from the work of his son who was nicknamed 'le clair' for his clearer palette.

Jan Josef Horemans was the leading chronicler of everyday life in Antwerp in the first half of the 18th century. He used various tricks of composition to present a vivid account of episodes in private houses, inns and courtyards. His scenes from contemporary everyday life combine observation but are executed with a certain stiffness.

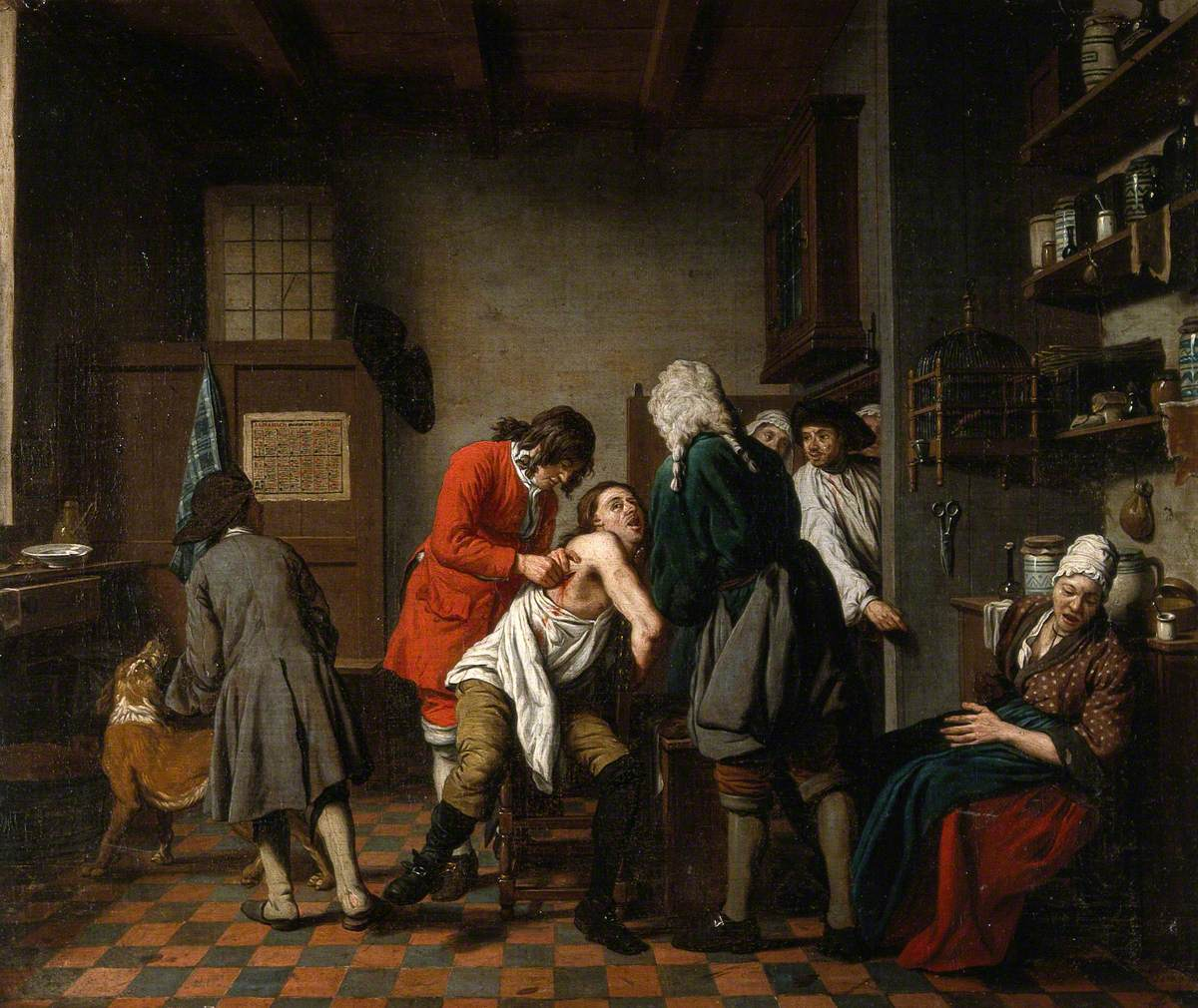
Interior with a surgeon and his apprentice attending to a patient

His works were highly prized on the market. Most of his paintings are signed.

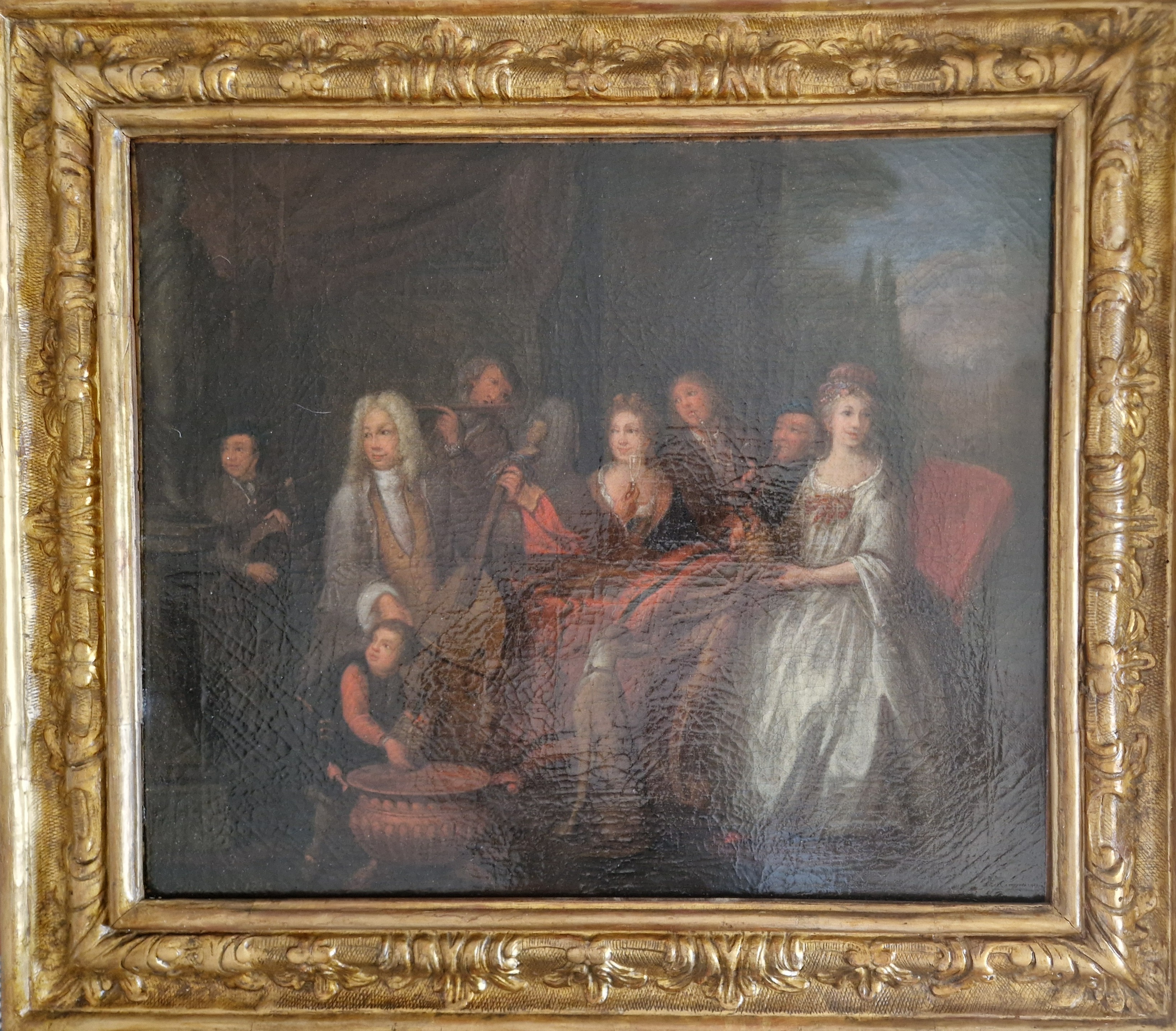
Musical Party, signed and dated 1742. Oil on canvas, 48.5 × 57.5 cm. Beatriz de Luna Art Collection, Covilhã, Portugal.
