= Nymphenburg Palace =

Baroque palace in Munich, Germany

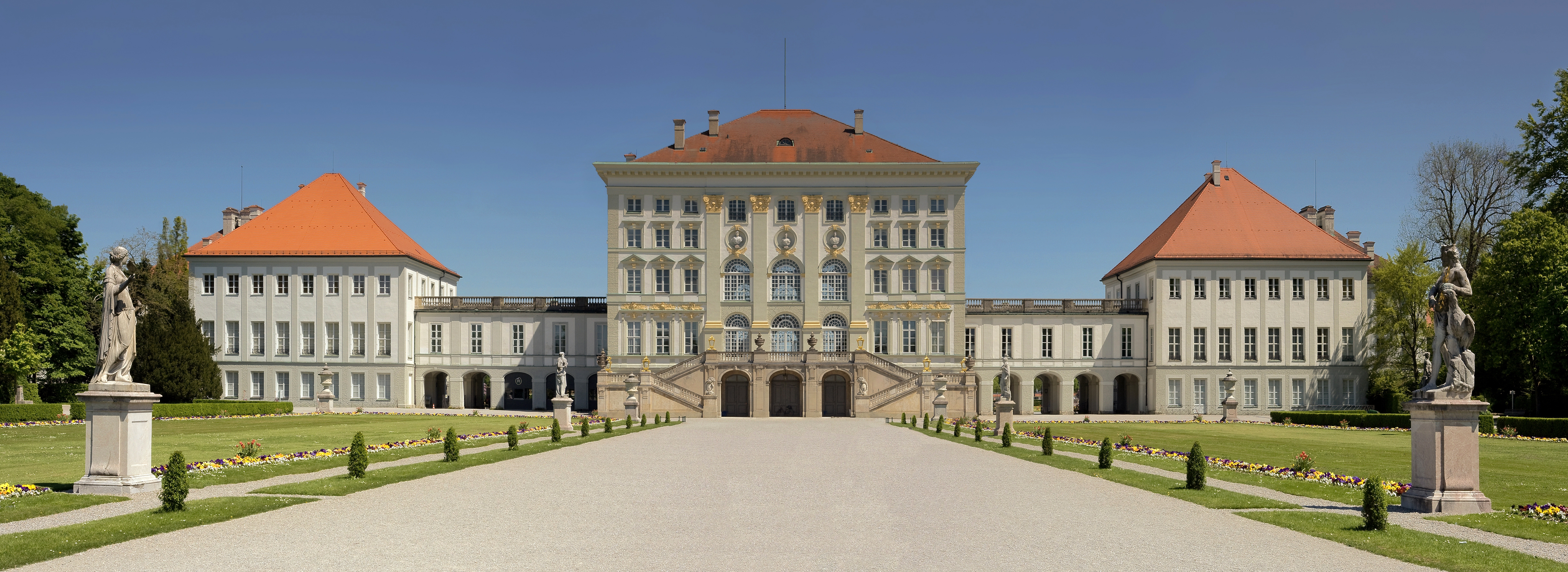

General information
- Architectural style: Baroque
- Location: Munich, Germany
- Coordinates: 48°09′29″N 11°30′13″E
- Construction started: 1664
- Completed: 1675

Design and construction
- Architect: Agostino Barelli
- Other designers: Enrico Zucalli, Giovanni Antonio Viscardi, Joseph Effner

The Nymphenburg Palace (German: Schloss Nymphenburg, Castle of the Nymphs) is a Baroque palace situated in Munich's western district Neuhausen-Nymphenburg, in Bavaria, southern Germany. The Nymphenburg served as the main summer residence for the former rulers of Bavaria of the House of Wittelsbach. Combined with the adjacent Nymphenburg Palace Park it constitutes one of the premier royal palaces of Europe. Its frontal width of 632 m (2,073 ft) (north–south axis) even surpasses Versailles.

== History ==
=== Building history ===
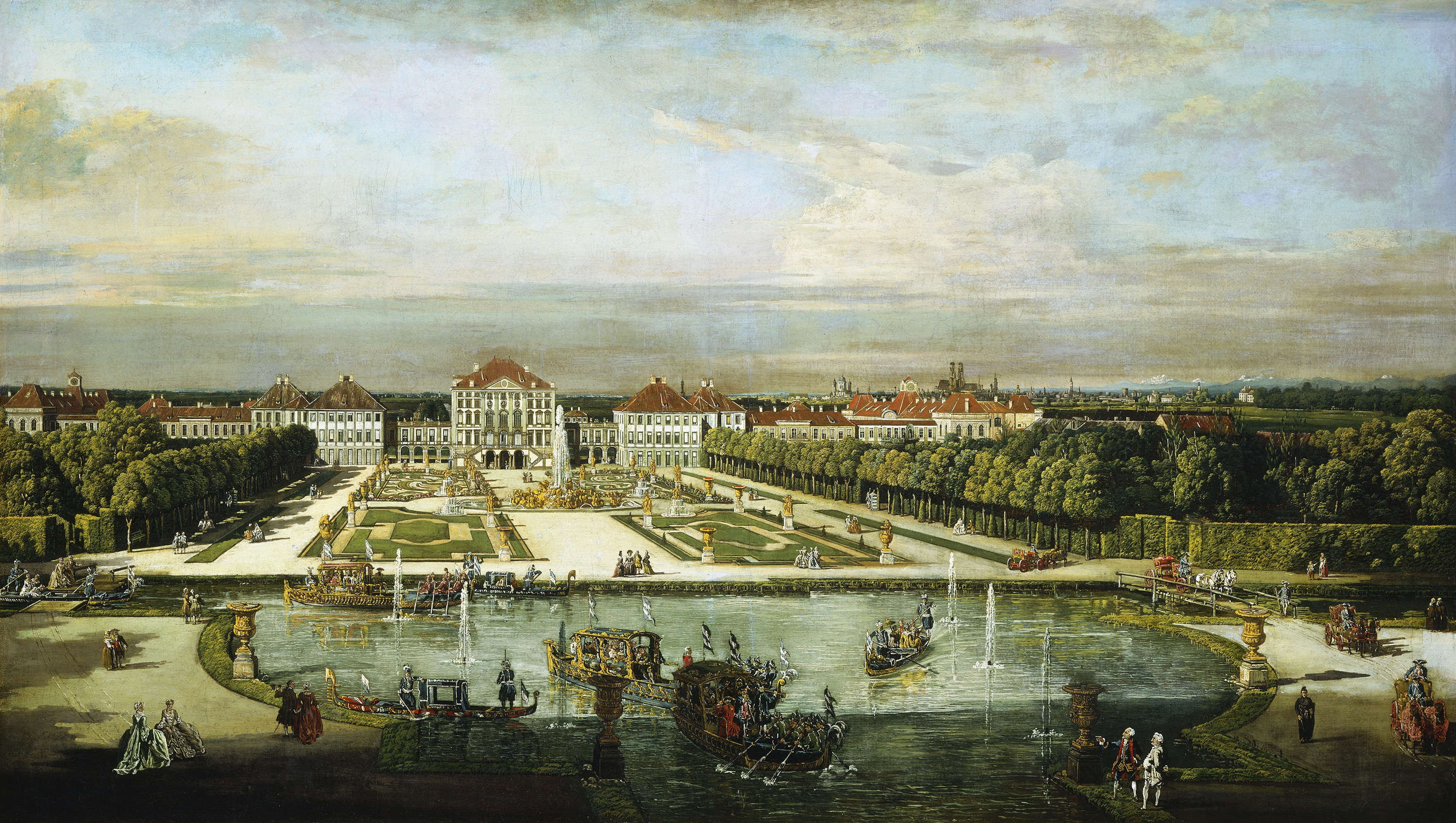
Nymphenburg Palace, around 1760, as painted by Bernardo Bellotto

The palace was commissioned by the electoral couple Ferdinand Maria and Henriette Adelaide of Savoy to the designs of the Italian architect Agostino Barelli in 1664 after the birth of their son Maximilian II Emanuel. During its construction Barelli was again replaced (1674) by Enrico Zuccalli. The concept for the mythological decorative programme was supplied by the scholar Emanuele Tesauro of Turin; the ceiling paintings were by Antonio Triva and Antonio Zanchi. The central pavilion was completed in 1675. As a building material, it utilised limestone from Kelheim. The palace was gradually expanded and transformed over the years. It then quickly replaced the nearby Blutenburg Castle as major hunting lodge of the court and competed to Schleissheim Palace.

Starting in 1701, Maximilian Emanuel, the heir to Bavaria, a sovereign electorate of the Holy Roman Empire, undertook a systematic extension of the palace. Two pavilions were added each in the south and north of Barelli's palace by Enrico Zucalli and Giovanni Antonio Viscardi and were connected with the centre pavilion by two gallery wings. In 1716, Joseph Effner redesigned the facade of the centre pavilion in French Baroque style with pilasters. Later, the south section of the palace was further extended to build the court stables (1719). For the sake of balance, the orangery building was added to the north which was only completed in 1758. Finally, Nymphenburg Palace was completed with a grand circle (the Schlossrondell) of Baroque mansions (the so-called Kavaliershäuschen – cavalier's lodges), erected under Maximilian Emanuel's son Holy Roman Emperor Charles VII Albert in the palace's driveway. His son Prince-Elector Maximilian III founded the Nymphenburg Porcelain Manufactory in 1747, to this day housed in one of these cavalier's lodges. Its fashionable Rococo products by porcelain sculptors Franz Anton Bustelli and Dominik Auliczek made the name Nymphenburg widely known.

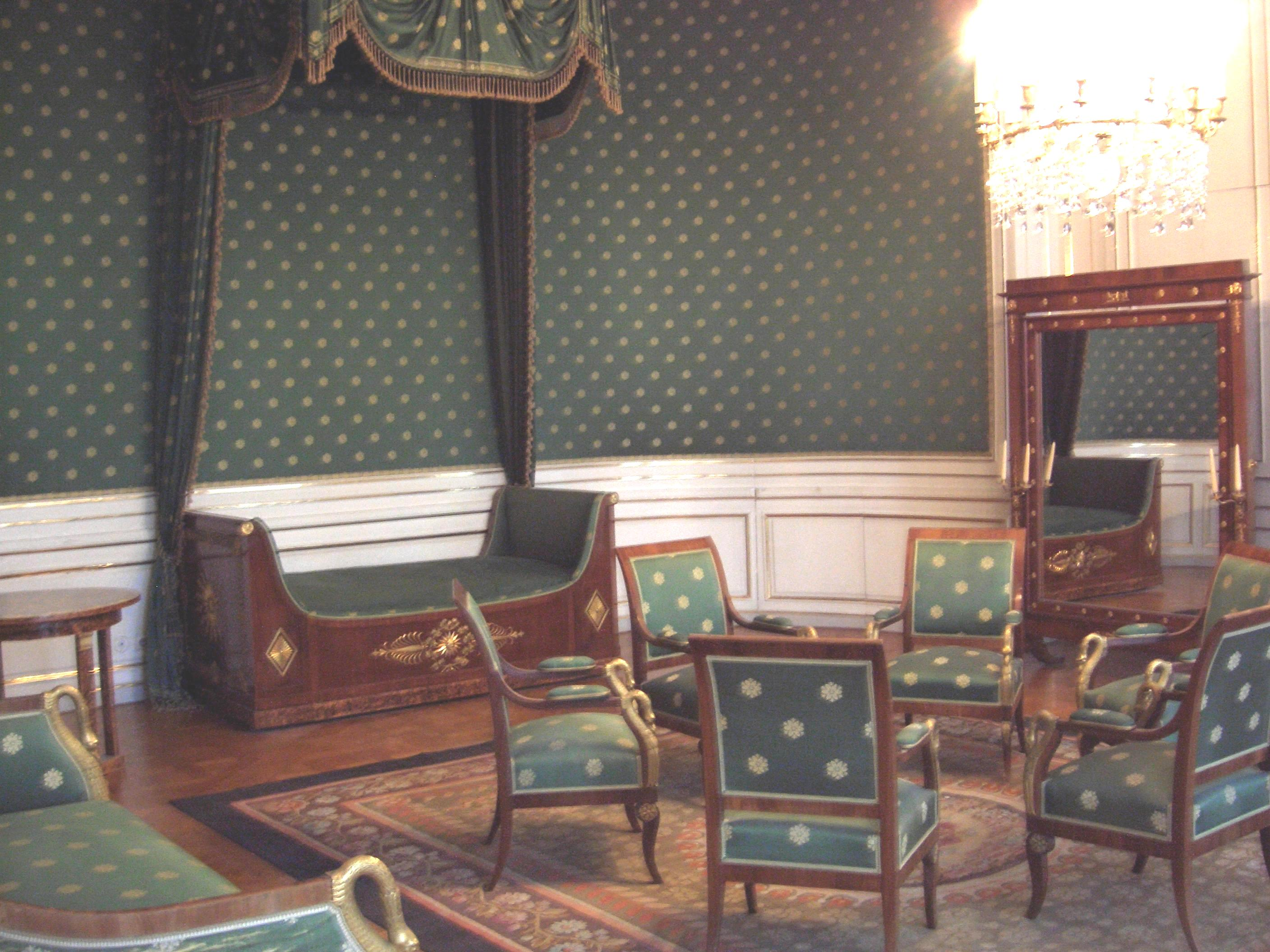
Birthroom of King Ludwig II of Bavaria

In 1795, Charles Theodore, Elector of Bavaria ordered the widening of the galleries on the park side. In 1826, under King Ludwig I of Bavaria, his architect Leo von Klenze removed the gables of the main pavilion with the Electoral coat of arms and created an attic style decoration directly under the roof instead.

Luitpold, Prince Regent of Bavaria with his son Ludwig, his grandson Rupprecht and his great-grandson Luitpold in the park of Nymphenburg Palace, about 1910

=== Residence ===
With the Treaty of Nymphenburg signed in July 1741, Charles Albert allied with France and Spain against Austria. Two of his children were born here: Maria Antonia (future Electress of Saxony) in 1724 and Maria Anna Josepha (future Margravine of Baden-Baden) in 1734. Charles Albert lived during his time in Munich as Holy Roman Emperor at Nymphenburg Palace and died there in 1745. In 1747, Elector Max III. Joseph founded the Nymphenburg Porcelain Manufactory. In 1792, Elector Charles Theodor opened the park for the public.

For a long time, the palace was the favourite summer residence of the rulers of Bavaria. King Max I Joseph died there in 1825 and his great-grandson King Ludwig II was born there in 1845. In 1863, the only meeting between Ludwig and Otto von Bismarck was held in Nymphenburg, although they remained connected in a lifelong friendship.

Today, Nymphenburg is open to the public but also continues to be a home and chancery for the head of the House of Wittelsbach, currently Franz, Duke of Bavaria.

== Palace ==
The palace, together with its park, is now one of the most famous sights in Munich. The baroque facades comprise an overall width of about 700 metres. Some rooms still show their original baroque decoration while others were later redesigned in rococo or neoclassical style.

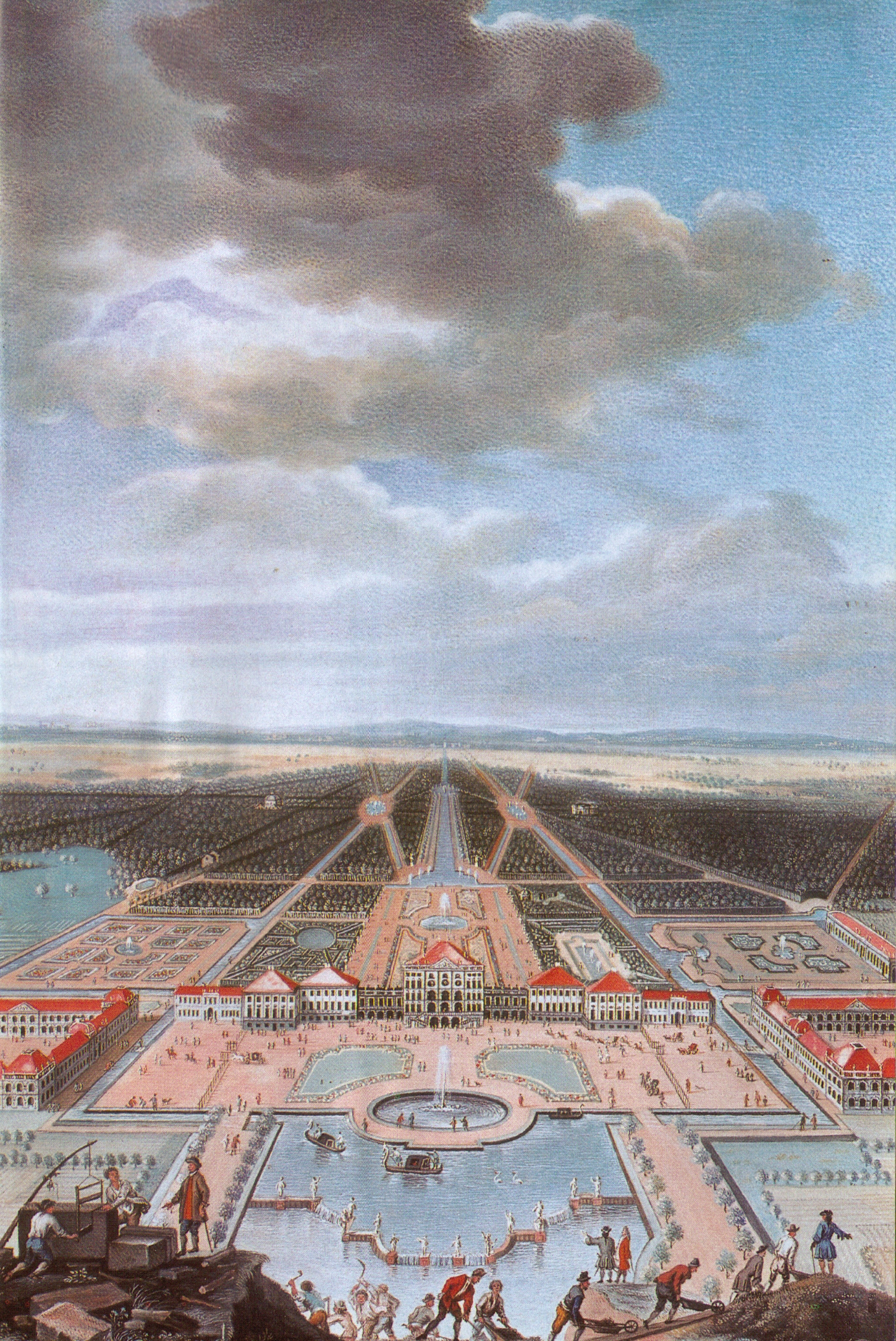
Nymphenburg, c. 1730

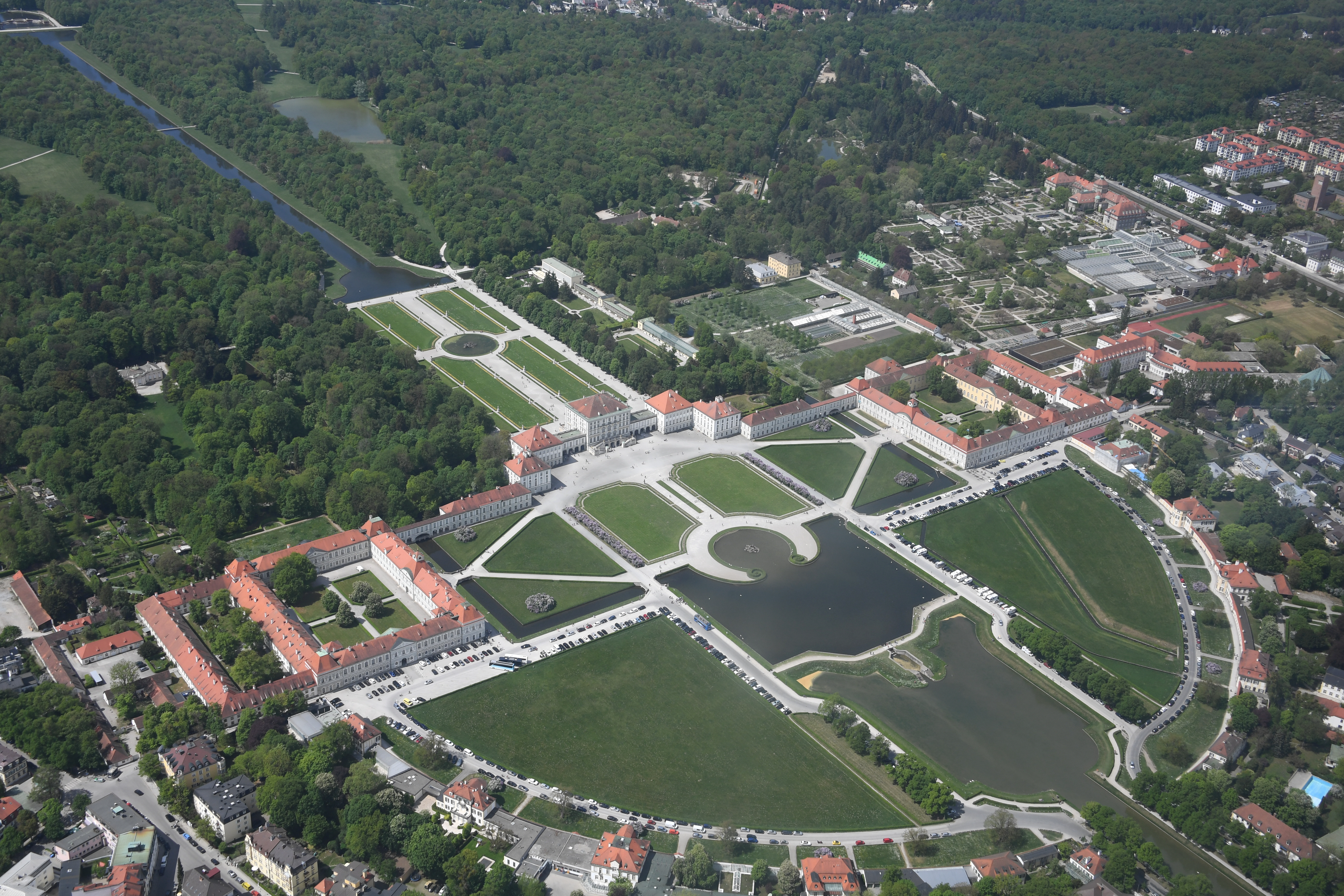
Aerial image of the Nymphenburg Palace

=== Central pavilion ===
The Steinerner Saal (Stone Hall) in the central pavilion, with ceiling frescoes by Johann Baptist Zimmermann and F. Zimmermann and decorations by François de Cuvilliés, is an impressive sight. Acting as a grand hall, it occupies over three floors of the central pavilion of the palace. The central ceiling fresco is Helios in his chariot, accompanied by other gods.

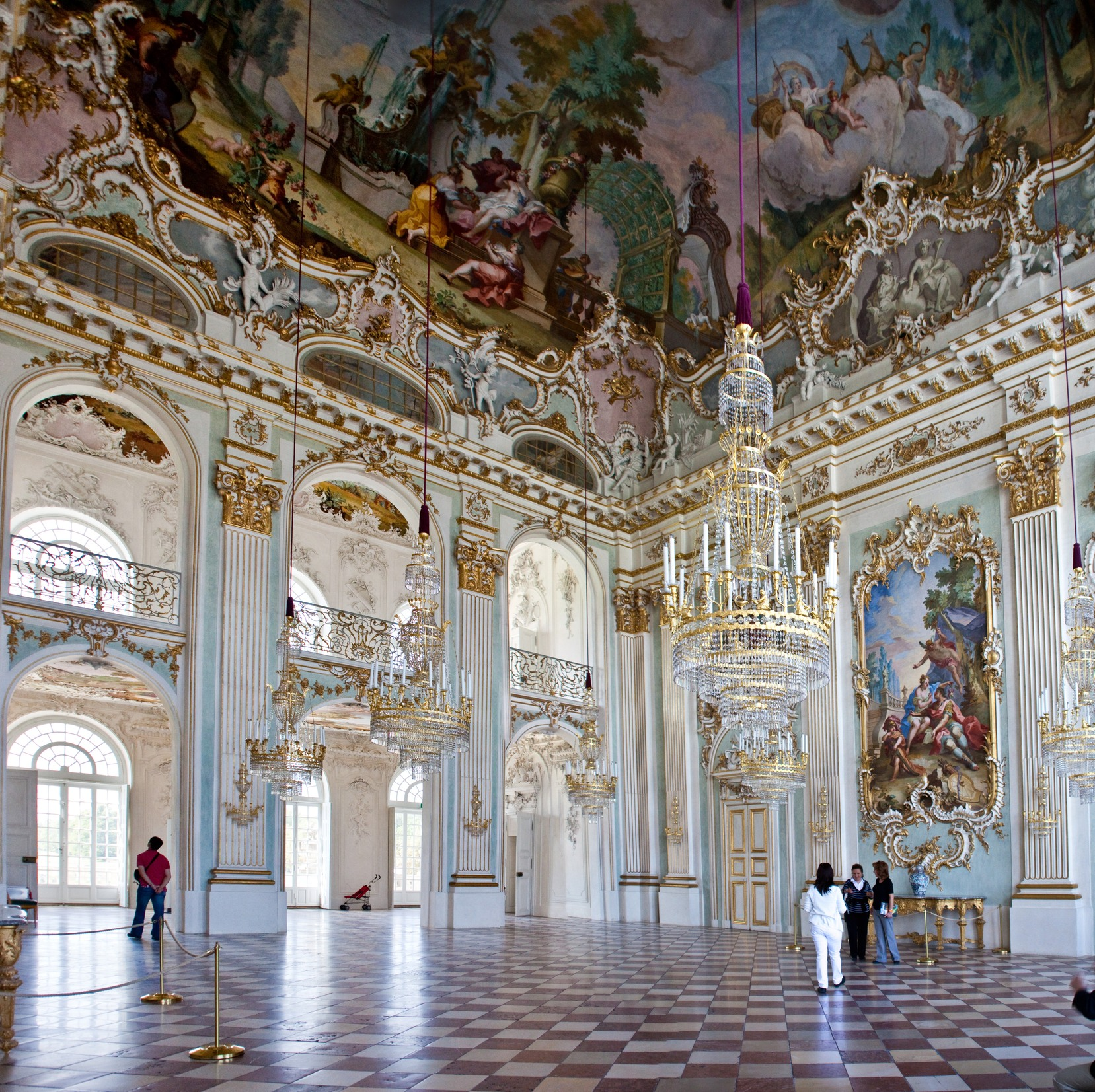
Steinerner Saal (Marble Hall)

North of the Stone Hall, there is the wood-panelled antechamber, the audience chamber decorated with Brussels tapestries and the former bedroom with the so-called Little Beauty Gallery with the ladies of Versailles; all rooms were remodelled under Maximilian II Emanuel in the style of the Régence but retain their original Baroque ceilings. Here are on display portraits of the elector and his wife Theresa Kunegunda Sobieska. The bedroom closes the park side, next to it is the Drechsel Cabinet (turnery cabinet) of Maximilian III Joseph, designed by François de Cuvilliés. Three rooms further to the north were created under Charles Theodore with the widening of the gallery wing. In the first room there are now more portraits of ladies from the Great Gallery of Beauties of Max Emanuel, the second one is decorated with a pile rug with the coats of arms of Bavaria and the Palatinate (known as "coat of arms room"), while the third room contains portraits of Charles Theodore and both his consorts Elisabeth Auguste and Maria Leopoldine.

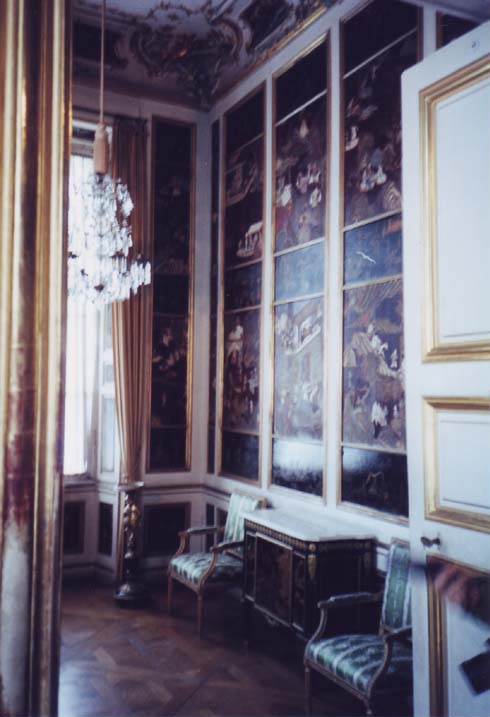
The Chinese Cabinet with chinoiserie, one of the rooms of Nymphenburg Palace

South of the Stone Hall are inversely to the northern rooms of the main building, the hall with the portrait of Charles Albert, the audience room with the portrait of the founding couple Ferdinand Maria and his consort Henriette Adelaide and the Former Bedroom with portraits of Max Emanuel and his consort Theresa Kunegunda. Here too, the original Baroque ceilings have survived. The walls of the so-called lacquer cabinet that adjoins the bedroom are almost completely covered with Chinese panels showing scenes from a Chinese novel. The stucco was done by Franz Xaver Feuchtmayer the Younger. Behind the south gallery are the Writing Cabinet and Antechamber of Elector Charles Theodore, which were created with the widening of the gallery wings.

In both the North and South Galleries next to the Central Pavilion are vedutes of Bavarian castles. These galleries connect the central pavilion with the southern and northern pavilions.

=== Southern pavilions and wings ===
The Inner southern Pavilion housed the apartments of the Electress during the period of its origin. The former small dining room of the Inner Southern Pavilion today houses the famous attraction Gallery of Beauties of King Ludwig I of Bavaria. On behalf of the king the court painter Joseph Karl Stieler portrayed 36 beautiful women from all social classes of Munich, the best known of these are the shoemaker's daughter Helene Sedlmayr and Ludwig's infamous mistress Lola Montez. In the nearby Queen's bedroom one can see where King Ludwig II of Bavaria was born on 25 August 1845. Its mahogany furniture was made in 1815 in Munich, unlike the mahogany furniture for Queen Caroline's audience room which was made in Paris, as was the furniture in the Queen's Study.

The Outer Southern Pavilion is generally inaccessible. It served as a kitchen building at Max Emanuel's time and was then reconstructed like the inner pavilion in neo-classical times. Further south, the third pavilion was built as a comedihaus and then served from 1750 as a new kitchen house. The southern corridor built in 1747 connects this building with the stables in the south wing.

In the former royal stables in the South Wing is the Marstallmuseum (carriage museum), with one of the greatest coach collections in Europe. They also played a part in historical events - the Paris Coronation Coach for example was used for the coronation of Emperor Charles VII in 1742. Among the main attractions of the museum are the magnificent carriages and sleighs of King Ludwig II.

The first floor of the former court stables houses a collection of Nymphenburg porcelain by the Nymphenburg Porcelain Manufactory which, also located in the palace complex, was founded by Maximilian III Joseph. Its handcrafted products are of legendary kind and quality, nowadays said to be comparable only to Augarten and Sèvres. Over 1,000 exhibits, beginning in 1747, are on display. The Nymphenburg Porcelain Manufactory itself is located in and behind one of the cavalier houses of the northern roundabouts. Prince Luitpold, the current owner of the manufactory, converted the cavalier house itself, which previously housed the manufactory's administration (production takes place in buildings at the rear), into a luxury holiday home in 2025, available for daily rental, under the name Nymphenburg Palace Royal Residence. It is managed by Kempinski Hotels.

In the adjoining Outer South Wing of the castle is a restaurant with beer garden.

=== Northern pavilions and wings ===
The Inner Northern Pavilion, the later so-called Crown Prince Building, is generally inaccessible. Here was Max Emanuel's appartement de parade and its representative rooms are today used by the Wittelsbach Compensation Fund. The upper floors serve as living quarters for the respective head of the House of Wittelsbach. The Outer Northern Pavilion houses the chapel, whose ceiling painting by Joseph Adam von Mölk deals with the life of St Mary Magdalene. It was already begun in 1702 by Antonio Viscardi from the design by Enrico Zuccalli. Further north is the third pavilion, the Gardemeublebau from 1723, an elongated building which served during the period of its origin for the Cue sports and the Jeu de Passe, a ball game inspired by Pall-mall, which was invented by Max Emanuel himself and was played indoors and outdoors. Today the Duke of Bavaria's administration is located here. It is connected to the north wing by the northern corridor of 1739.

Since 1990, the Museum of Man and Nature has been housed in the North Wing. The Hubertus Hall upstairs served for concerts. Today the Hubertus Hall, the Orangery Hall, and the Johannis Hall in the North Wing as well as the Iron House in the park can be booked for parties, concerts, conferences and other functions. From 1835 the Mary Ward Elementary School was in the adjoining Outer North Wing of the castle. Founded by Mary Ward, it paved the way for a better education for girls. Mary Ward came after travelling from Rome to Munich in 1627 and was sponsored by Elector Maximilian I. King Ludwig I finally invited the girls' school to the Nymphenburg Palace in 1835.

== Park ==
=== Garden structure ===
Nymphenburg Palace Park
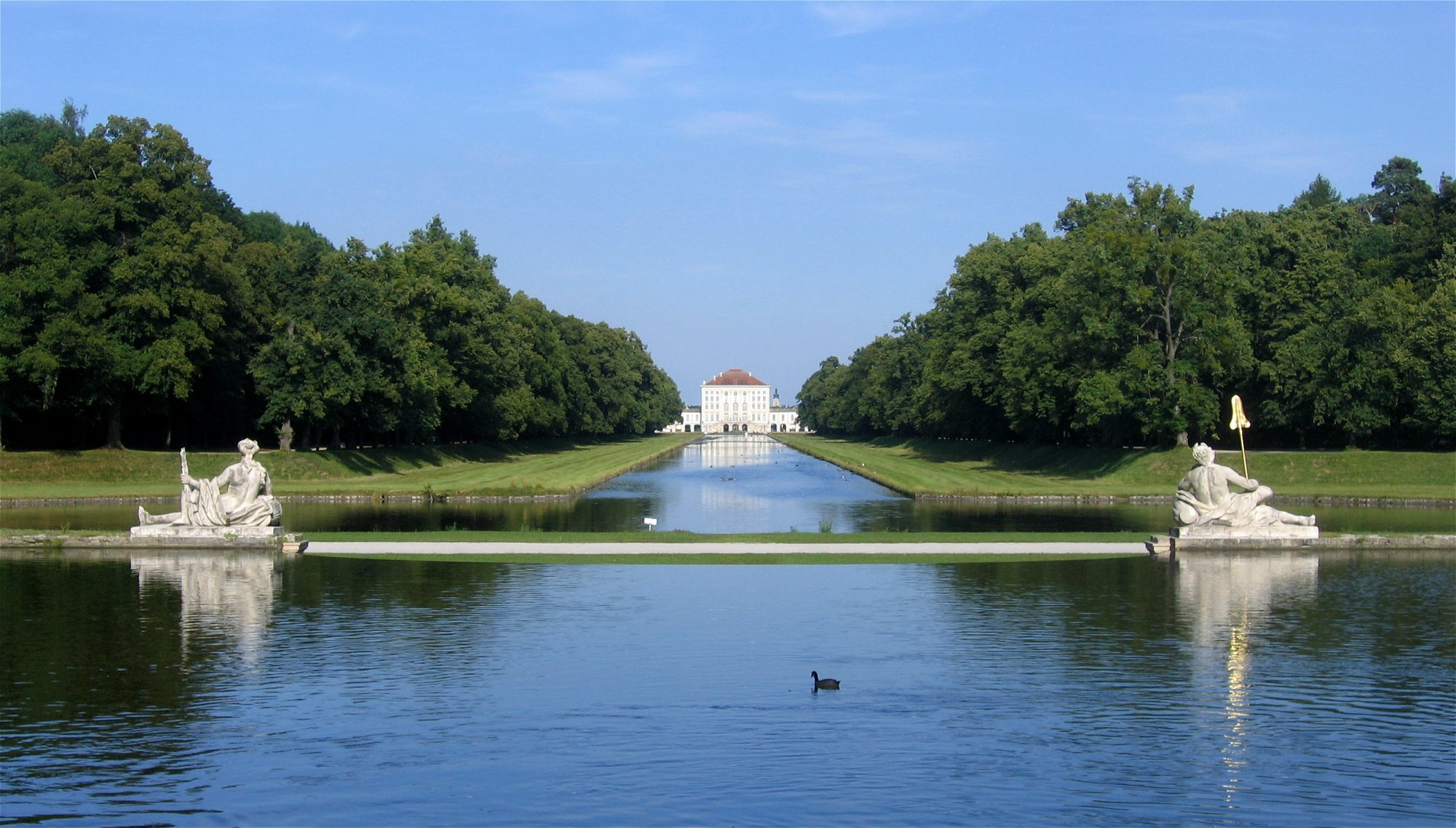
- Nymphenburg Durchblick Grosse Kaskade in Munich
- Interactive map of Nymphenburg Palace Park
- Location: Munich, Bavaria, Germany
- Area: 229 km^{2} (88 sq mi)
- Created: 1701
- Operator: Bavarian Administration of State-Owned Palaces, Gardens and Lakes
- Status: Open year round

The 200-hectare (490-acre) park, once an Italian garden (1671), which was enlarged and rearranged in French style by Dominique Girard, a pupil of Le Nôtre, was finally redone in the English manner during the early 19th century by Friedrich Ludwig von Sckell, on behalf of prince-elector Charles Theodore. Von Sckell was also the creator of the English Garden in Munich. He preserved the main elements of the Baroque garden (such as the "Grand Parterre"). The park is bisected by the long western canal along the principal axis which leads from the palace to the marble cascade (decorated with stone figures of Greek and Roman gods) in the west. The iron greenhouse north of the Grand Parterre was completed in 1807, the adjacent geranium house in 1816.

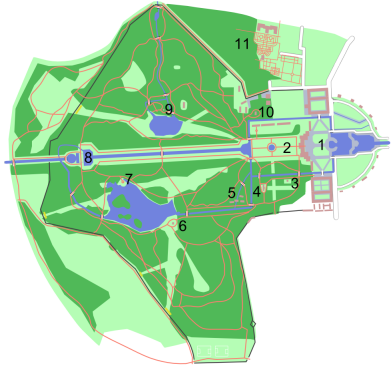
Overview: 1 Palace, 2 Grand parterre, 3 Crown prince garden, 4 Amalienburg, 5 Dörfchen with Brunnhaus, 6 Badenburg, 7 Monopteros, 8 Marble cascade, 9 Pagodenburg, 10 Magdalenenklause, 11 Botanical Garden

The garden parterre is still a visible feature of the French garden. As part of the transformation of the entire castle grounds by Sckell it was simplified, but retained its original size. The "Grand Cascade" was built by Joseph Effner in 1717. He was referring to a concept of François Roëttiers. The water falls in the middle of a two-part water staircase, the first stage being half round to the west, the second, deeper, is formed to the east. The cascade consists of symmetry which continues through the centre channel. The right side of the cataract was covered with pink marble in 1770. Originally a supporting architecture was to be provided, which was never executed. Instead, from 1775 to 1785, sculptures were added. Many were the work of Dominik Auliczek and Roman Anton Boos, who later added twelve decorative marble vases with mythological themes.

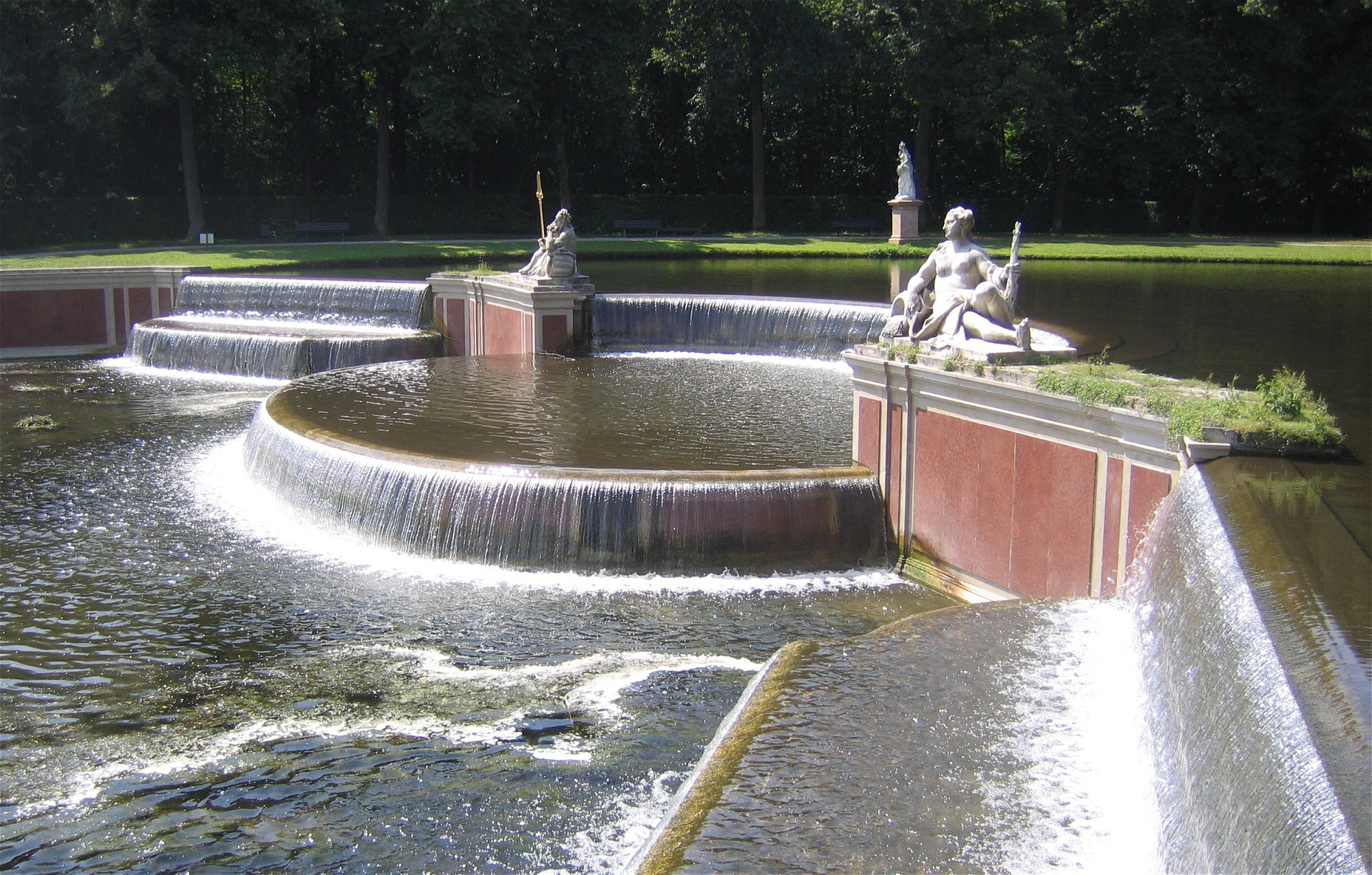
The Grand Cascade. Statue of Isar on the right, of the Danube on the left

The fountains in front of the palace and in the garden parterre continue to be operated by the water powered Pumping Stations built between 1803 and 1808.

The Northern Cabinet Garden is small garden that borders directly the garden side of the north wing of the main palace. It is also called Kaisergarten, because it is in the immediate vicinity of the rooms where Charles Albert lived during his time in Munich as Emperor Charles VII. It has its counterpart in the Southern Cabinet Garden where François de Cuvilliés built an octagonal bird house in 1757.

Two lakes are situated on both sides of the canal. The "Dörfchen" was created under Maximilian III Joseph as Petit hameau. The "Salettl" (1799), a cottage with its little garden nearby close to the former menagerie served as attraction for the children of Maximilian IV Joseph.

The garden wall (1730–1735) preserves several Ha-ha effects. A passage close to the old arboretum in the north of the Grand Parterre leads to the large Botanical Garden of Munich. Originally there was also a visual axis, the Durchblick, to the north-west-located Blutenburg Castle.

The canals of Nymphenburg are part of the northern Munich channel system, a system of waterways that connected also to the complex of Schleissheim Palace. The endpoint of the eastern canal leading from the city to the palace forms the Cour d'honneur and the centre was designed by Effner as a water parterre with a fountain, cascade and branching canals on both sides. The driveway ("Auffahrtsallee") from the city on both sides of the eastern canal is framed by a semicircle of smaller baroque buildings ("Kavalierhäuser") at the Cour d'honneur. The eastern endpoint of the canal is the Hubertusbrunnen (1903, a fountain building by Adolf von Hildebrand).

=== Garden pavilions ===
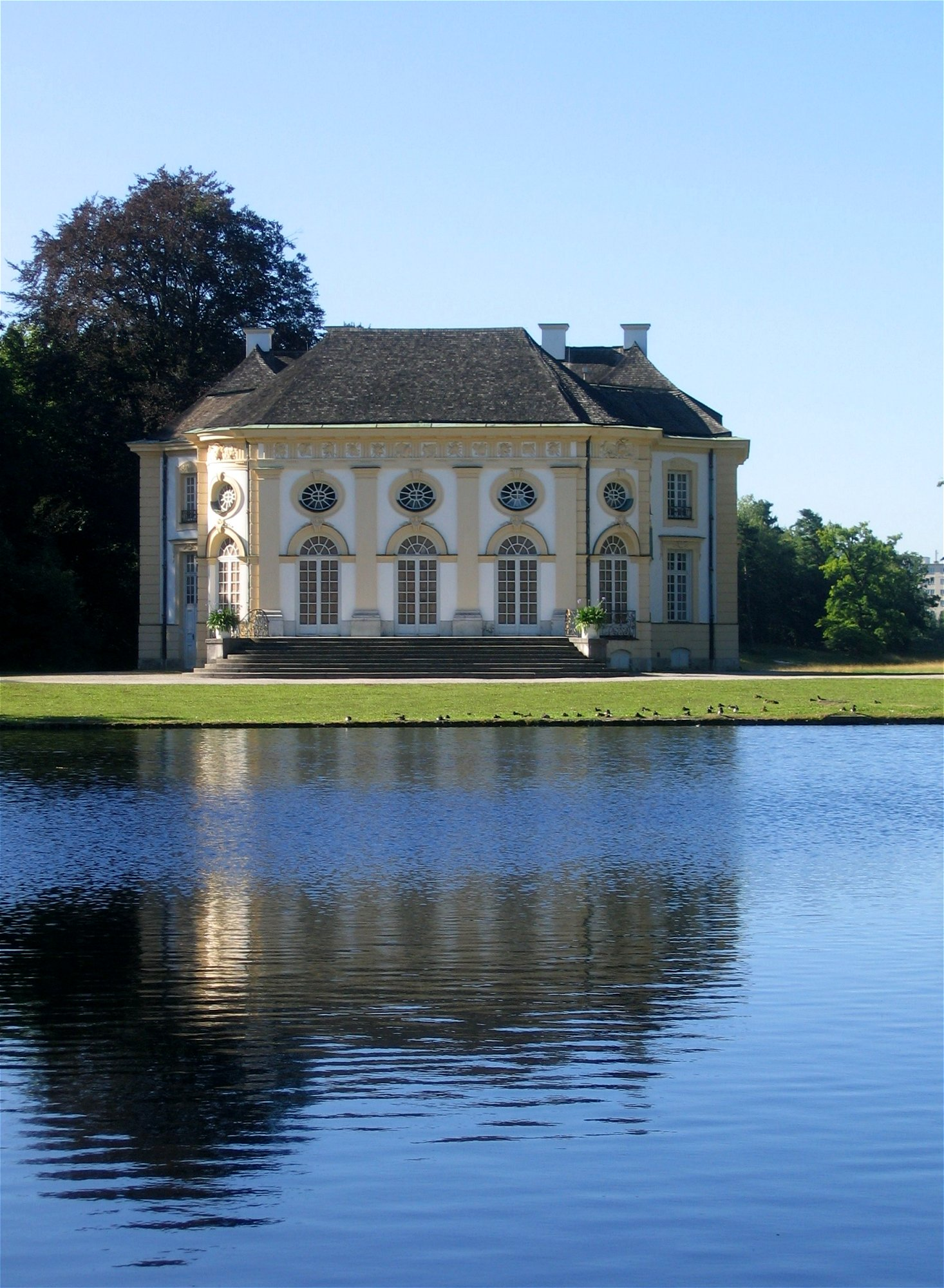
Badenburg, Royal bathing house

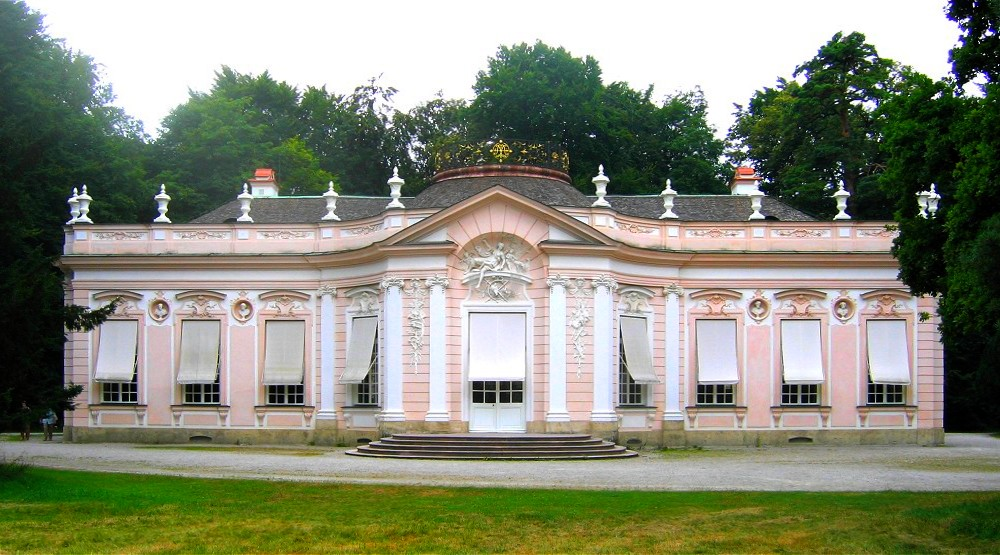
Amalienburg, Royal hunting lodge

Within the park, a number of pavilions - palaces en miniature - were built:

- The Pagodenburg (1716–1719) – an octagonal, two-story pavilion with Delft tile decoration downstairs and Chinoiserie upstairs. It was built by Joseph Effner as "maison de plaisance" and tea house.
- The Badenburg (1719–1721) – a Baroque pavilion also by Joseph Effner. It served for the private bathing and contains several rooms including a grand banqueting hall with a festive ornament decor by Charles Dubut and a very large tiled bath with a pool. The dressing room is decorated with various Chinese printed wallpapers. In the Monkey Cabinet the Elector performed his toilette. It was the first major building in Europe for centuries that was exclusively for the purpose of enjoying a comfortable bathroom.
- The Magdalenenklause – a faux ruin for retreat and meditation, erected between 1725 and 1728. The building with its prayer room is considered as an early representative of the hermitage and the ruins of architecture in Germany; it was to serve Max Emanuel as a place of contemplation - a memento mori, whose completion the elector however did not longer witness.
- The Amalienburg – a Rococo hunting lodge constructed in 1734–1739 by François de Cuvilliés for Charles Albert and his wife, Maria Amalia of Austria, including a hall of mirrors (designed by Johann Baptist Zimmermann and Joachim Dietrich) and a kennel room for the hunting dogs. The building with its decoration is a definite masterpiece at the climax of European rococo.
- The Apollotemple – a neoclassical monopteros temple by Leo von Klenze, erected in 1862–1865.

The architecture of the garden pavilions was influential for other architecture in Germany. So the Wittelsbach Falkenlust Palace was built in the style of the Amalienburg while the Pagodenburg served as prototype for the building of the same name in Rastatt.

== Tourism ==
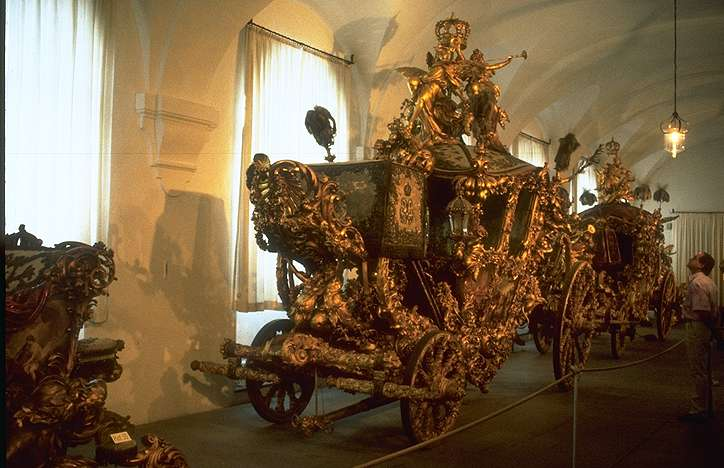
Marstallmuseum Nymphenburg

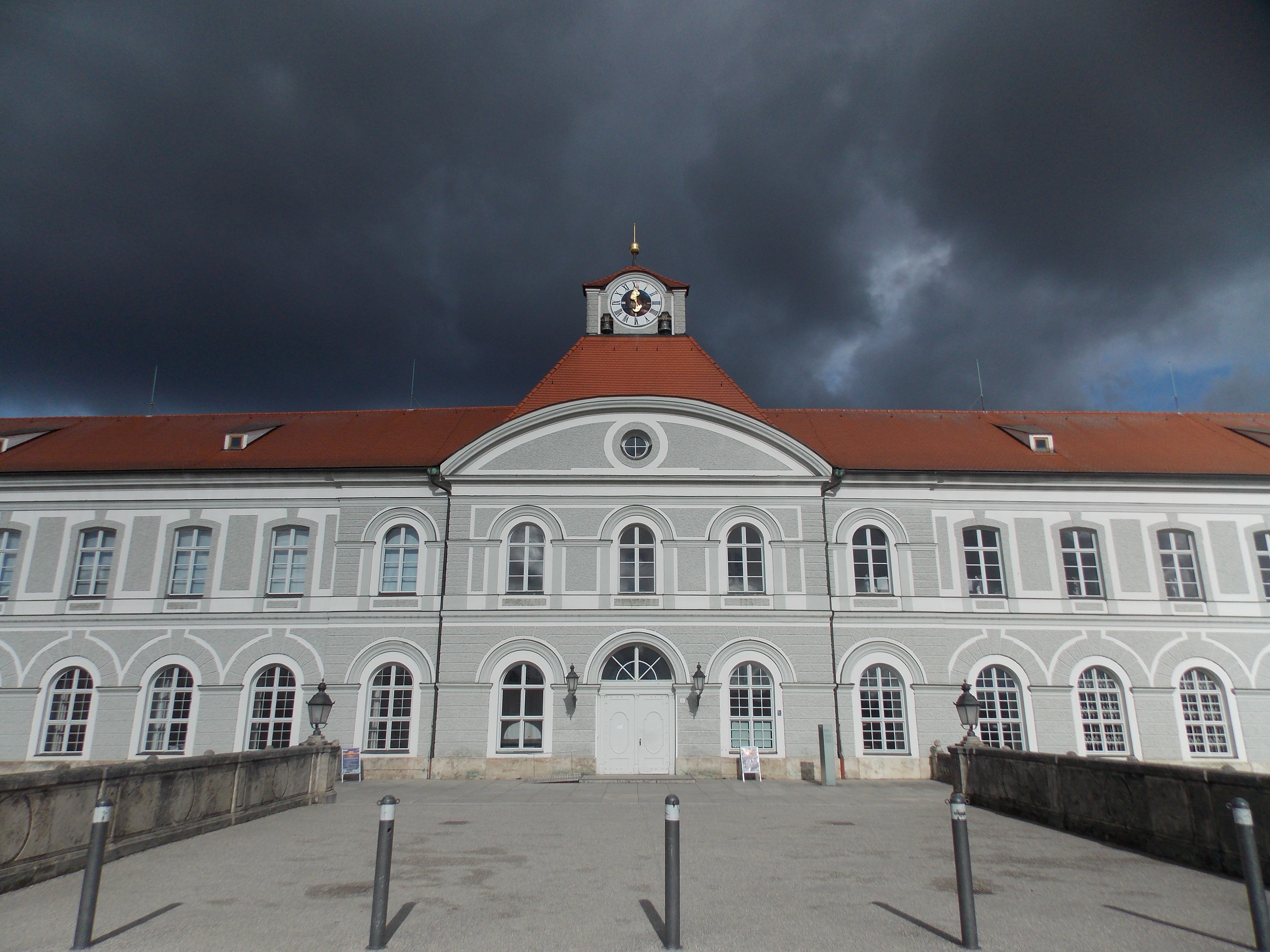
Front Facade of the Court Stables within Nymphenburg Palace (2014)

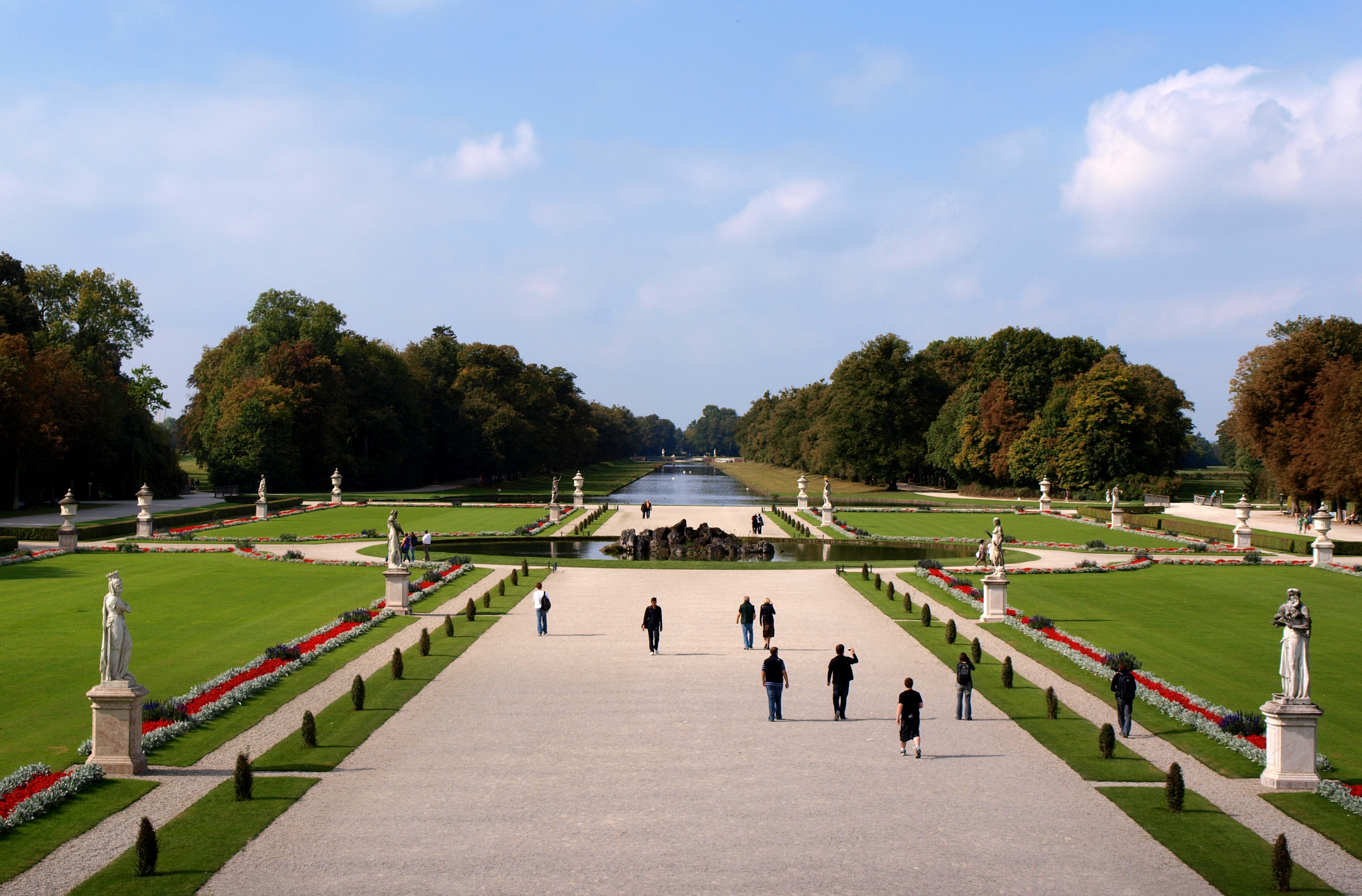
The grand parterre

The main building alone has more than 300,000 visitors per year. Nymphenburg Palace has as many visitors as the Munich Residence and more than Schleissheim Palace, though the castles of King Ludwig II, especially Neuschwanstein, are more frequented.

Museums:

- Schlossmuseum (Royal apartments: Central pavilion, North and South Galleries, Inner Southern Pavilion, Garden pavilions)
- Marstallmuseum (Carriage Museum: South wing)
- Porzellanmuseum München (Nymphenburg porcelain museum: South wing)
- Museum of Man and Nature (North wing)
- Erwin von Kreibig-Museum (South Schlossrondell)

Schloss Nymphenburg is accessible by Munich public transport's tram number 17. This line passes through the city centre, including Stachus and the main train station.

== Miscellaneous ==
Between 1936 and 1939 open air events called "Nacht der Amazonen" (Night of the Amazons) were performed. These shows in the park comprised 2000 players with international stars, bare-breasted girls and included also members of the SS Cavalry under Hermann Fegelein.

The palace and its park were some of the main filming locations of Alain Resnais's 1961 film Last Year at Marienbad. Ludwig, a 1972 film directed by Italian director Luchino Visconti about the life and death of King Ludwig II, was partly filmed in Nymphenburg.

The Dressage Facility for the equestrian events of the 1972 Summer Olympics was created in the Nymphenburg park.

The palace serves also as headquarters of the Bavarian Administration of State-Owned Palaces, Gardens and Lakes.

== Images ==
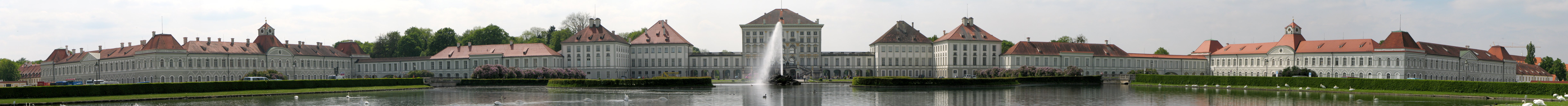
Panoramic view of Nymphenburg Palace
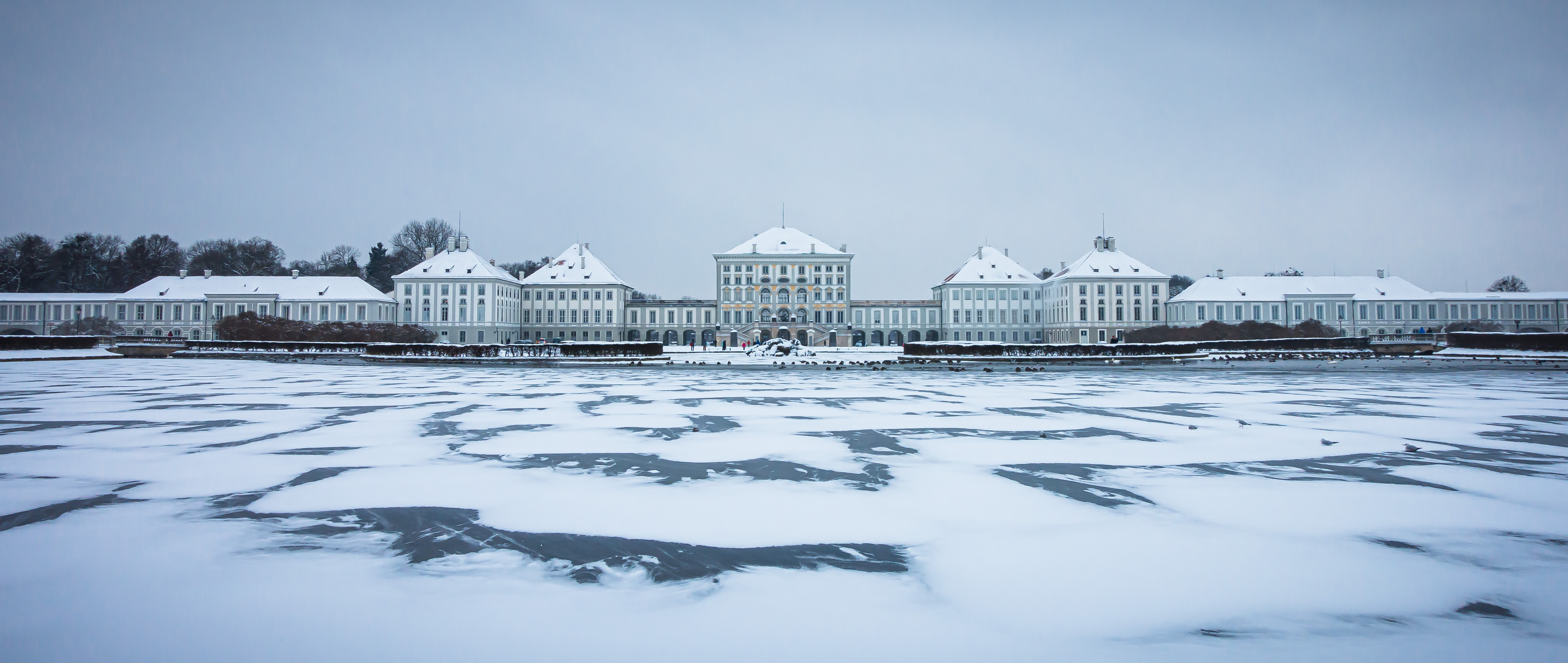
Panoramic view of Nymphenburg Palace in winter
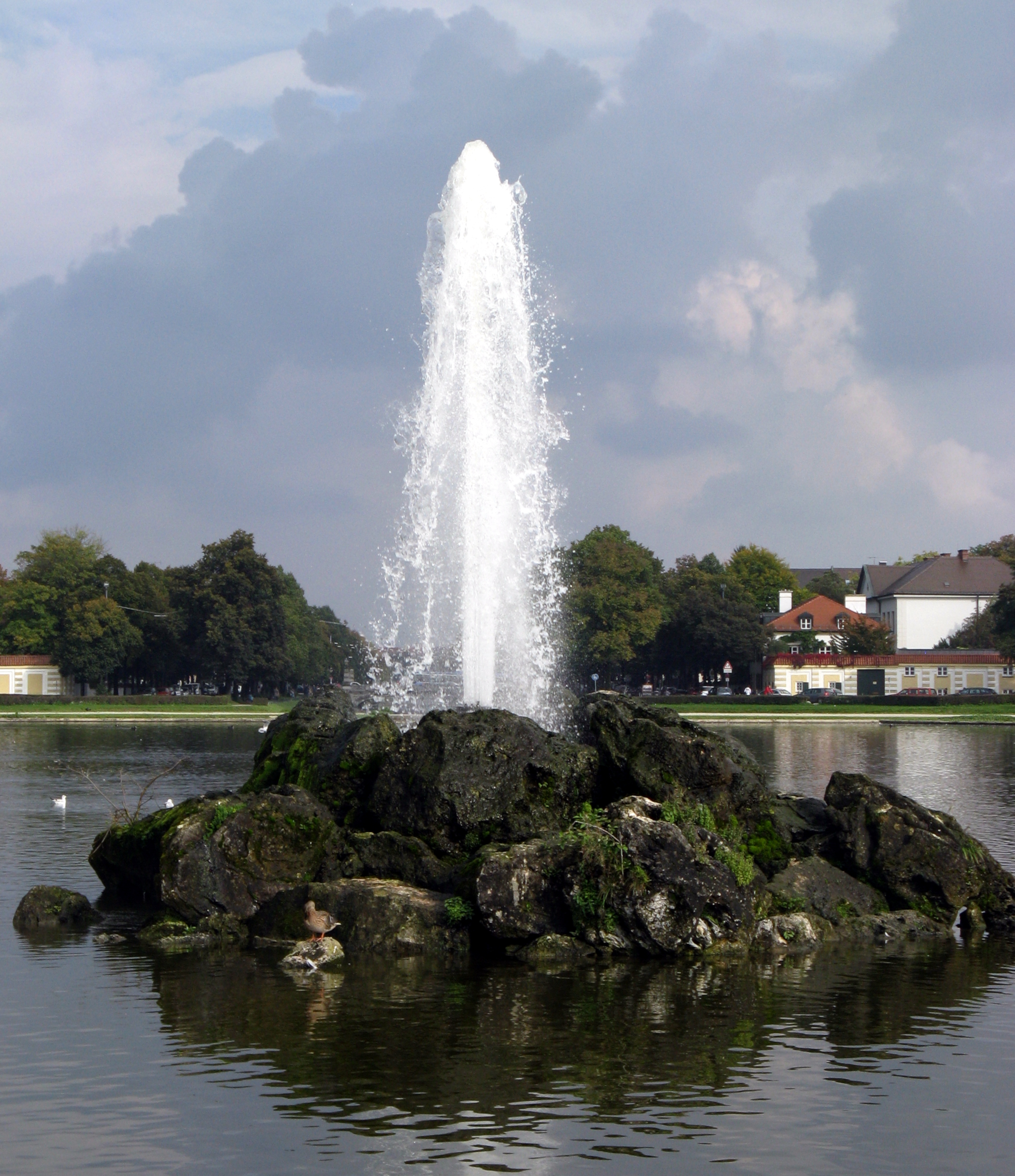
Fountain at Nymphenburg Palace

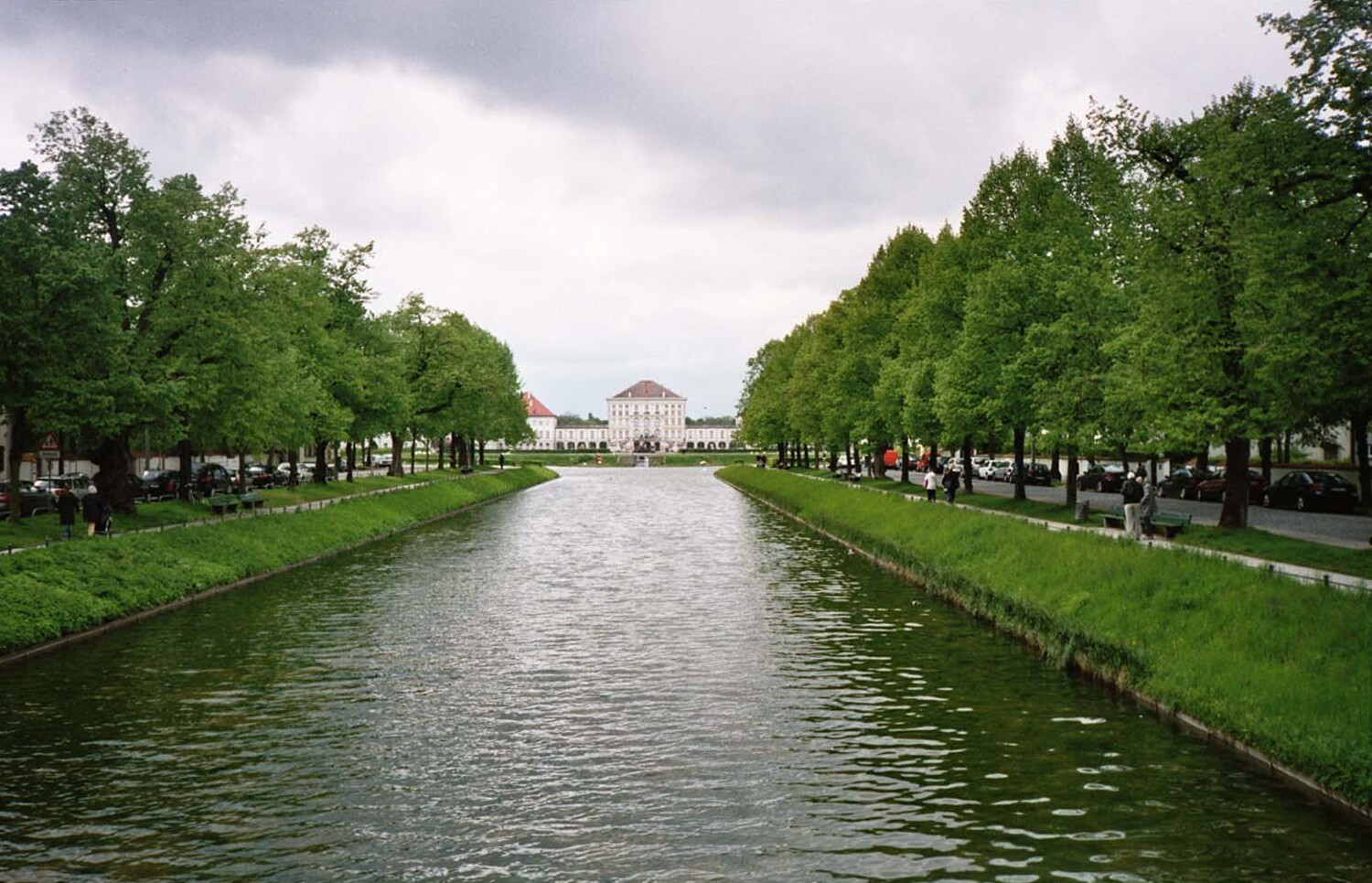
Main approach

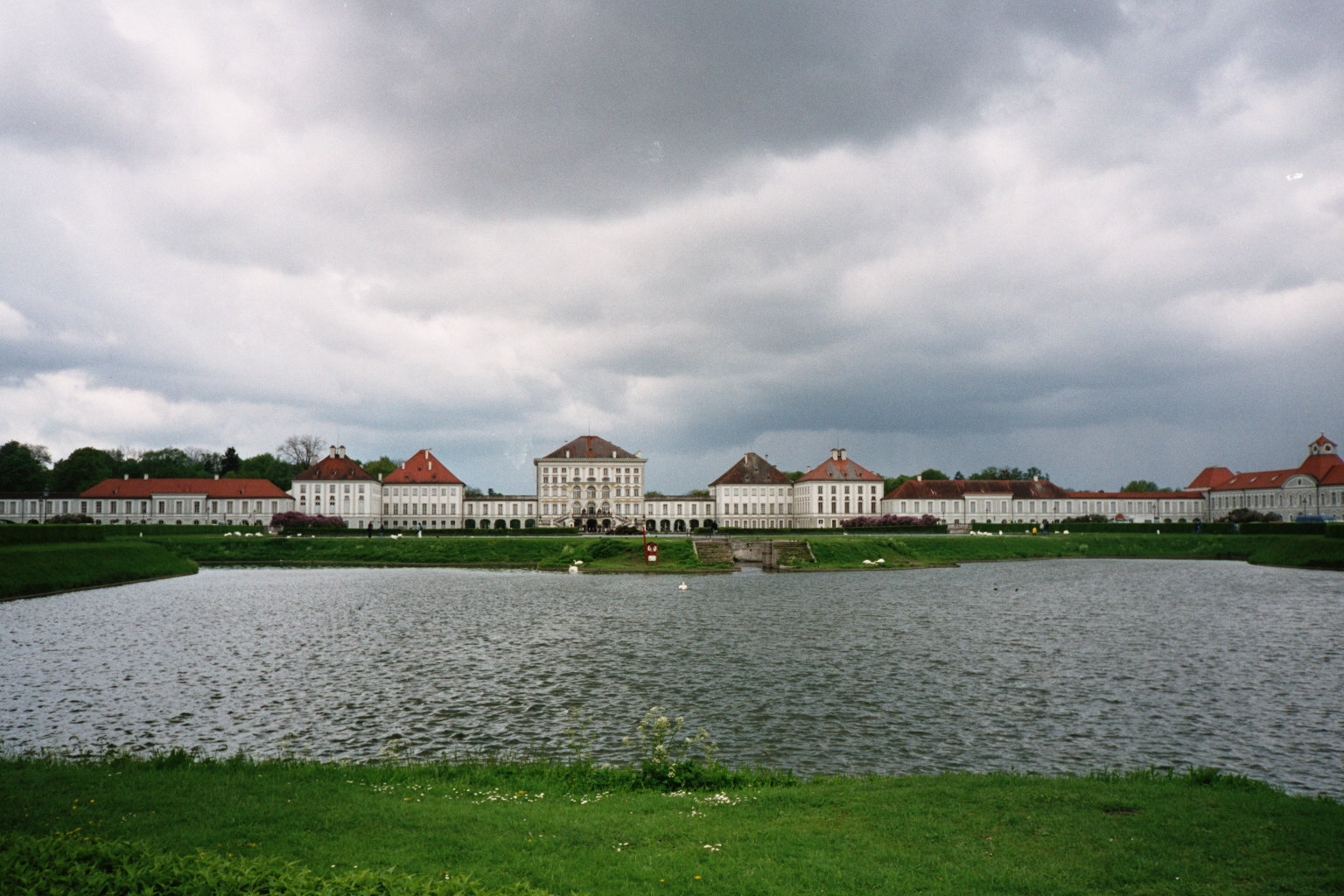
Front view

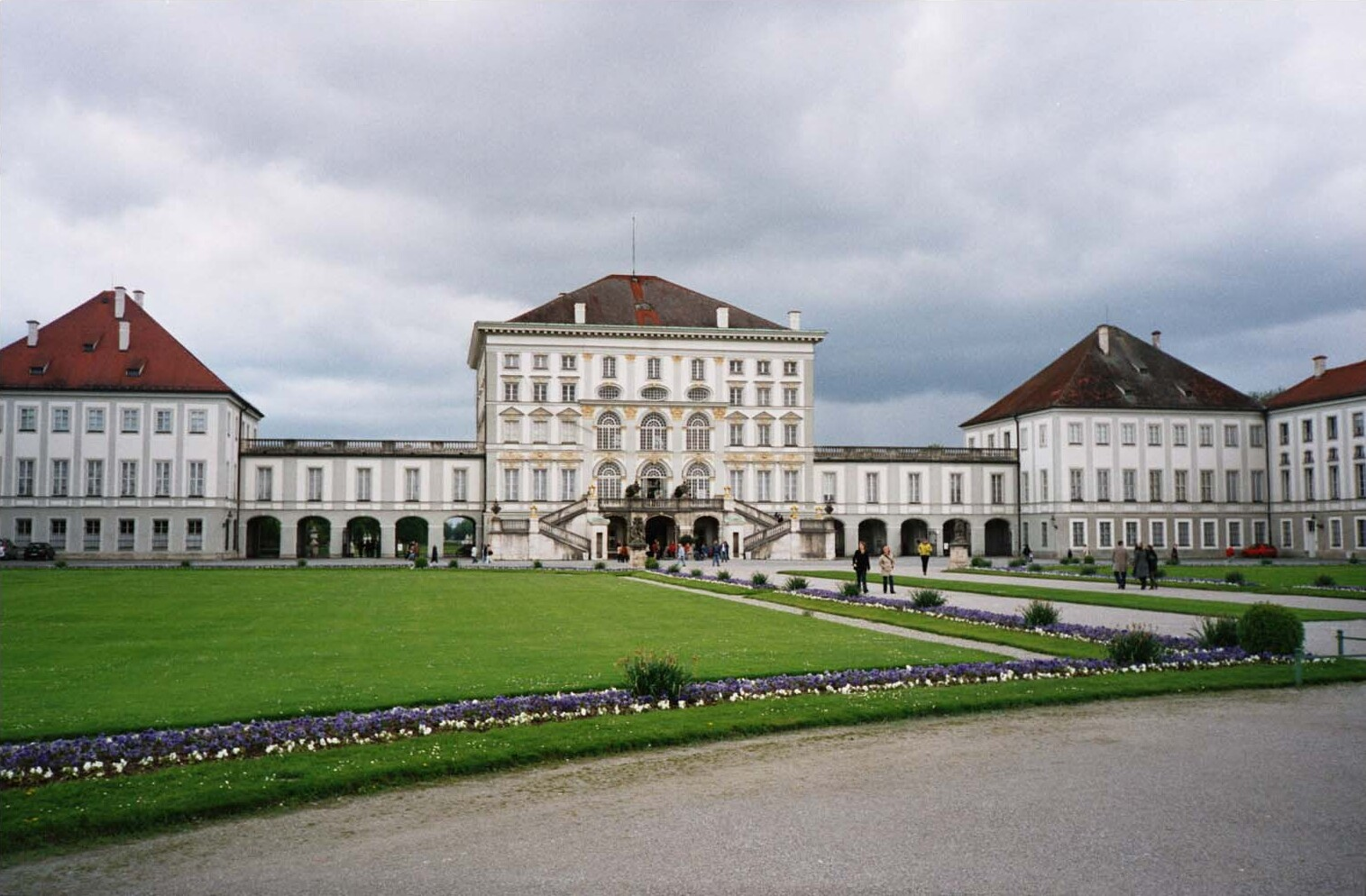
Back view

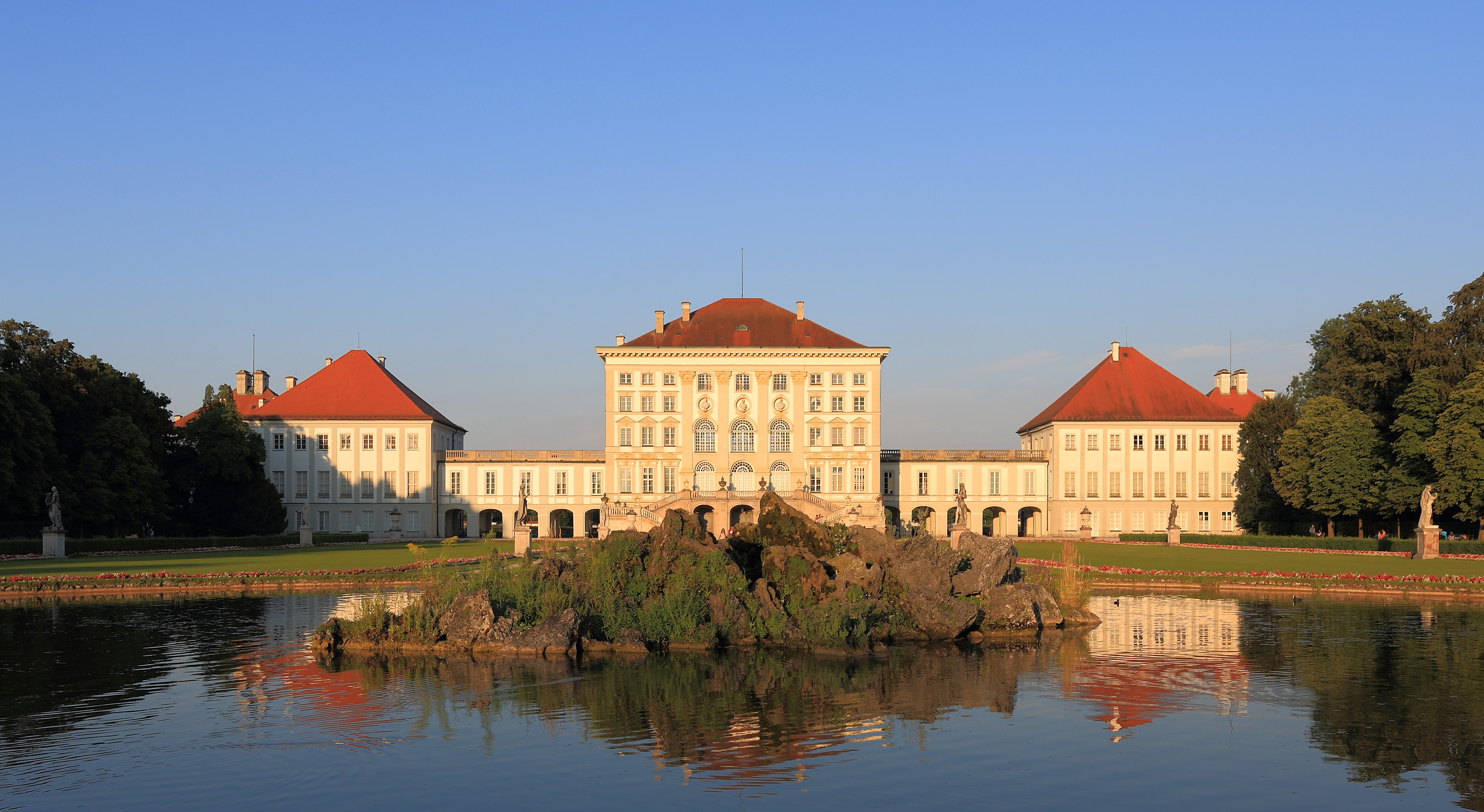
Back view at sunset

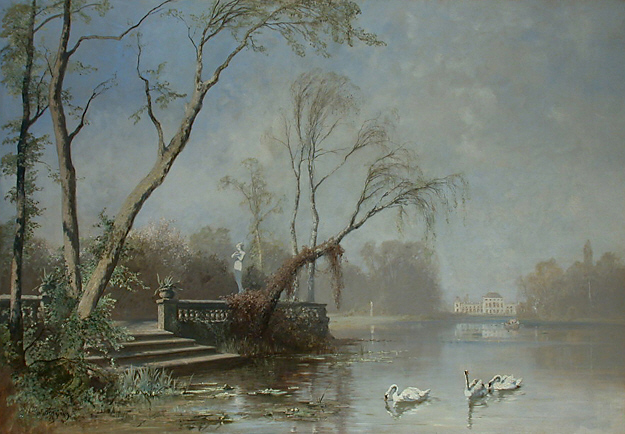
View from the lakeside, painting by Josef Wenglein, 1883

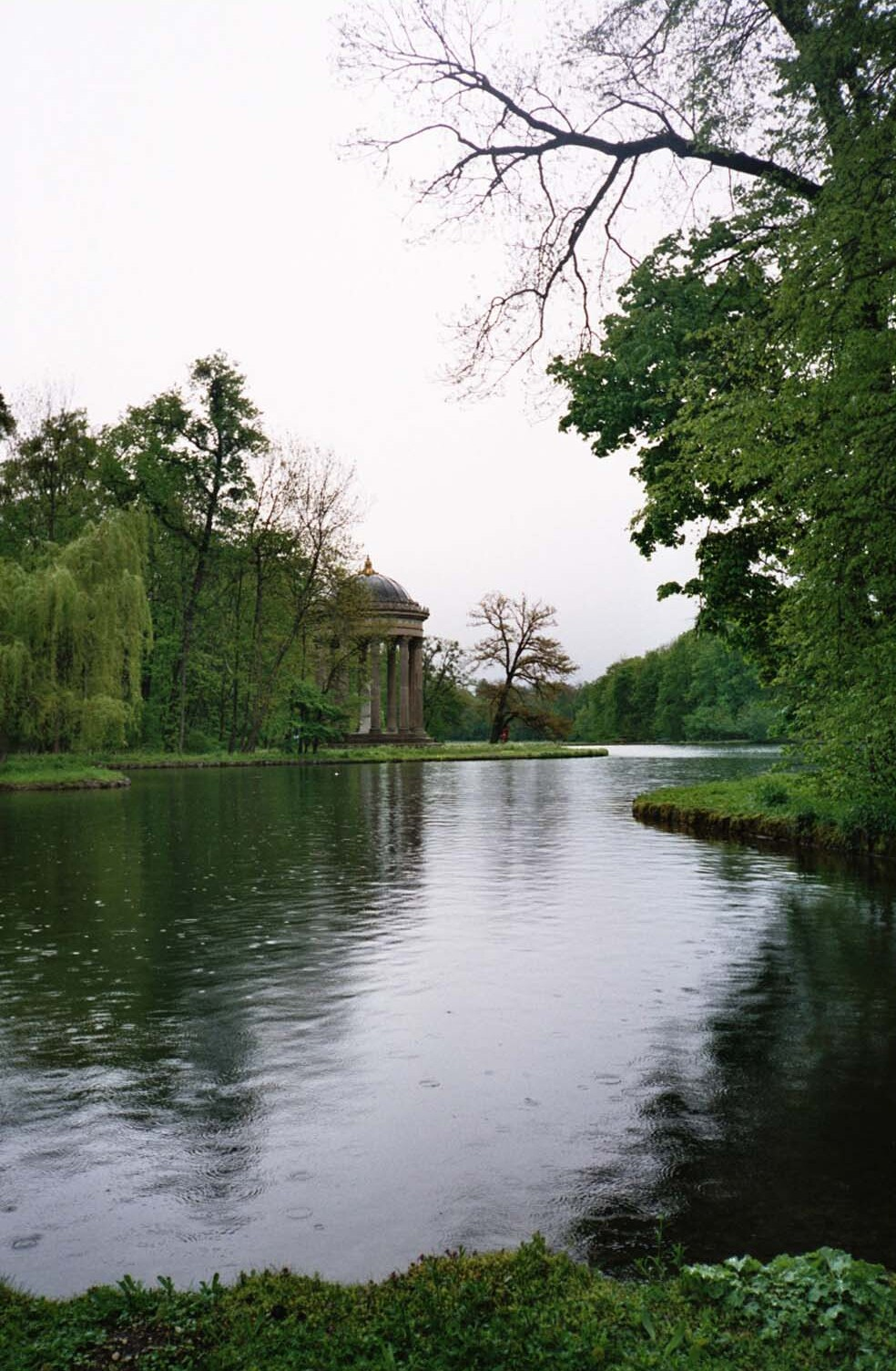
Monopteros

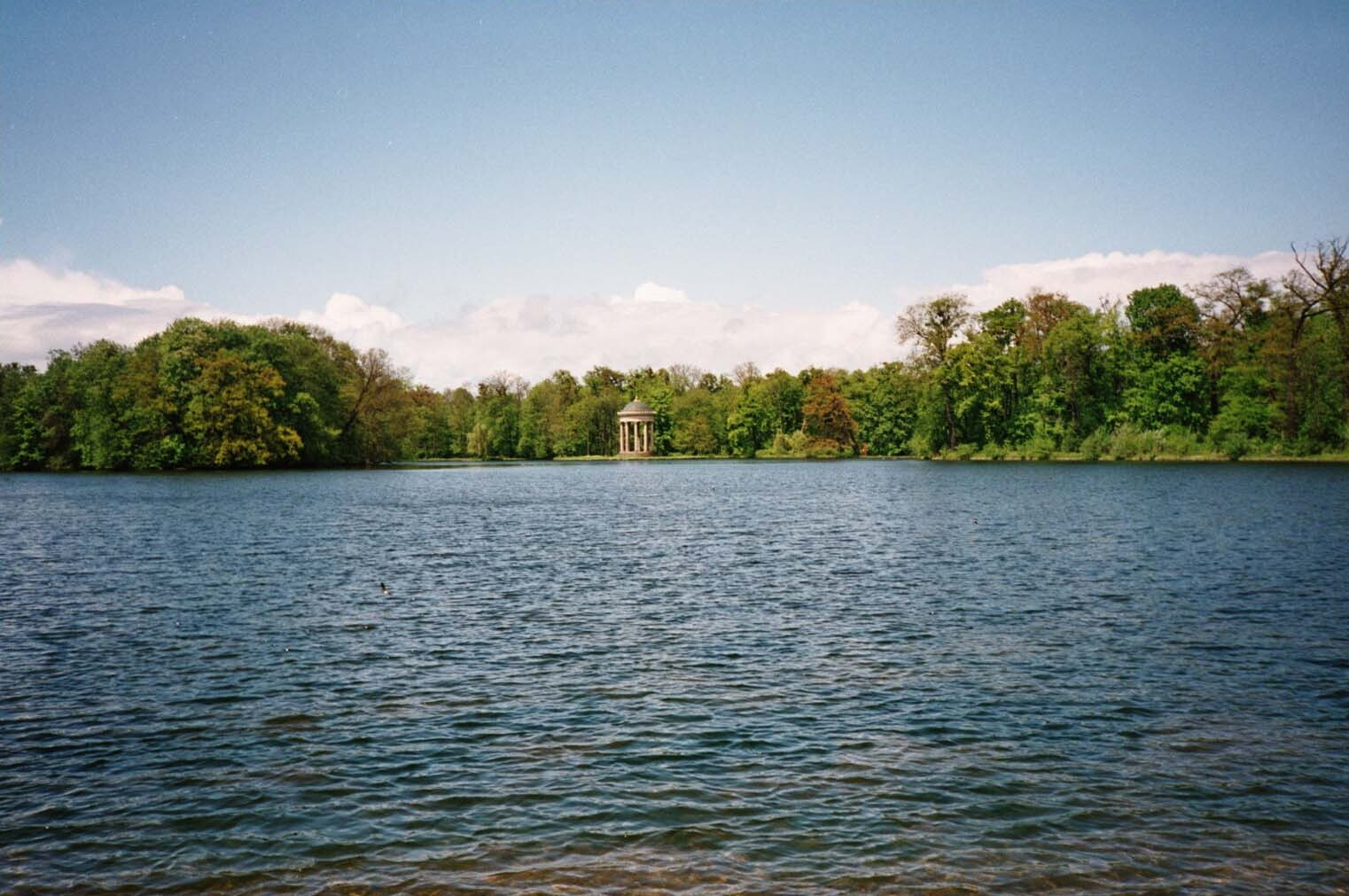
View toward Monopteros

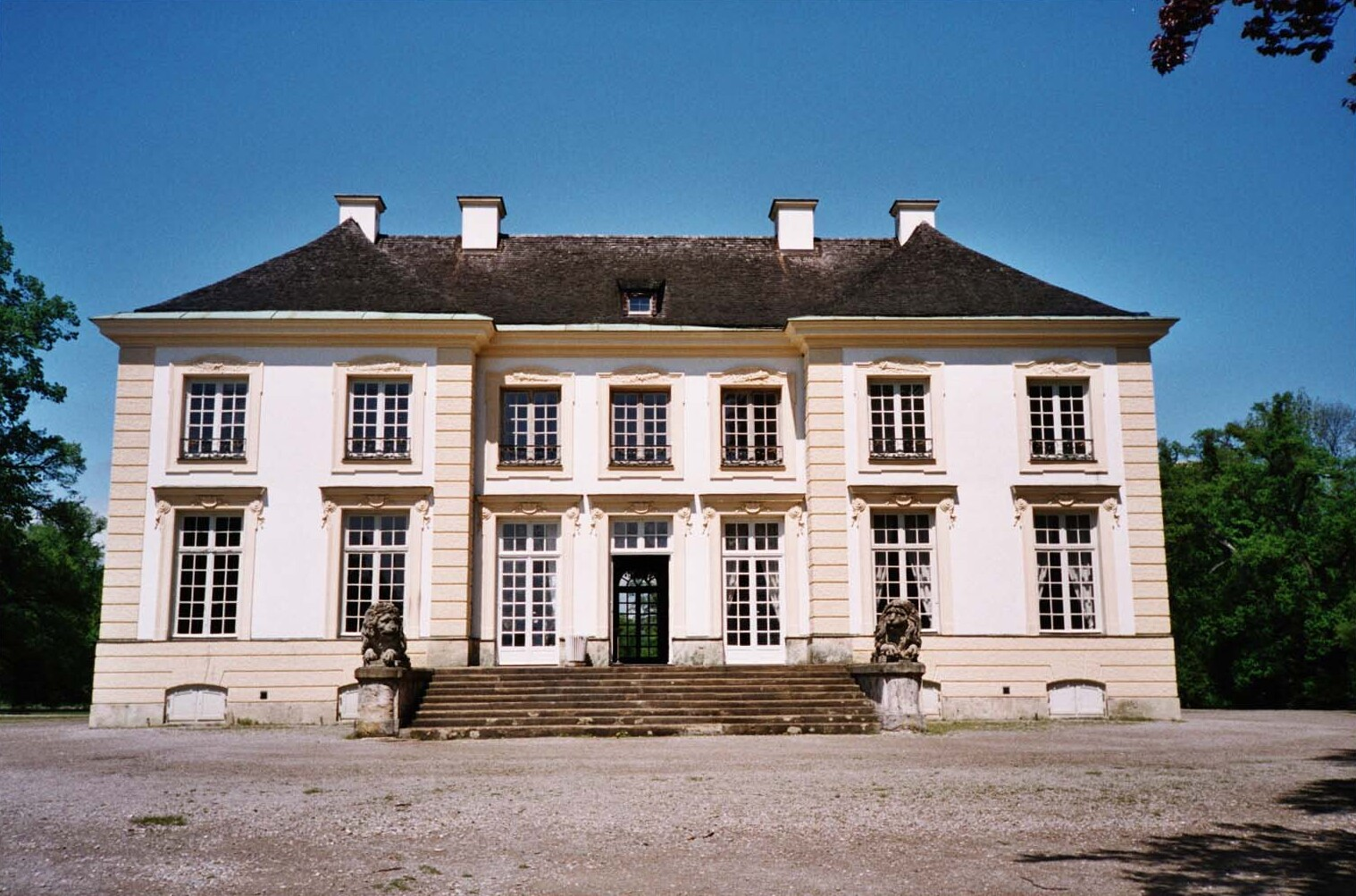
Badenburg, royal bathing house

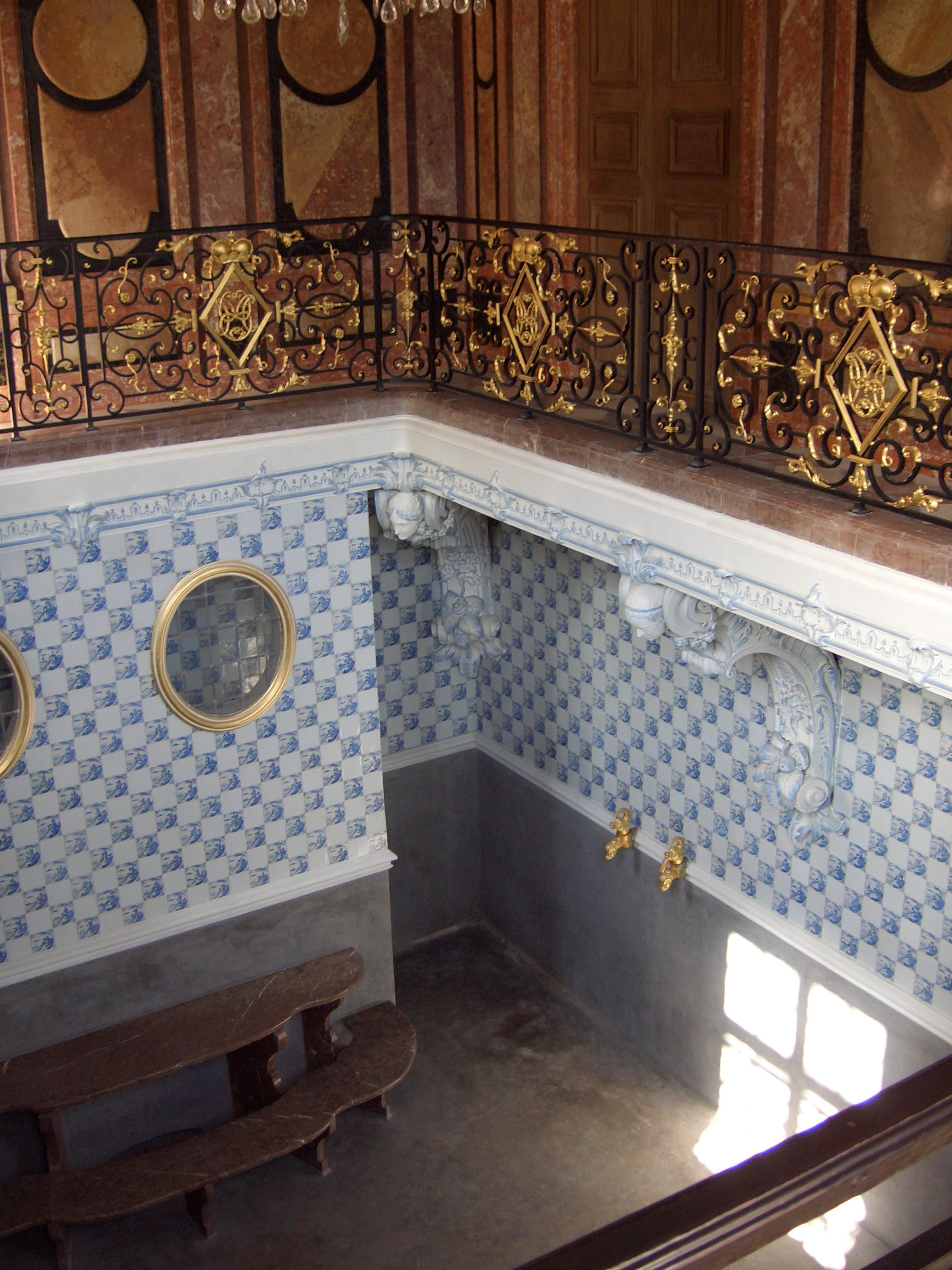
Badenburg, royal bathing house

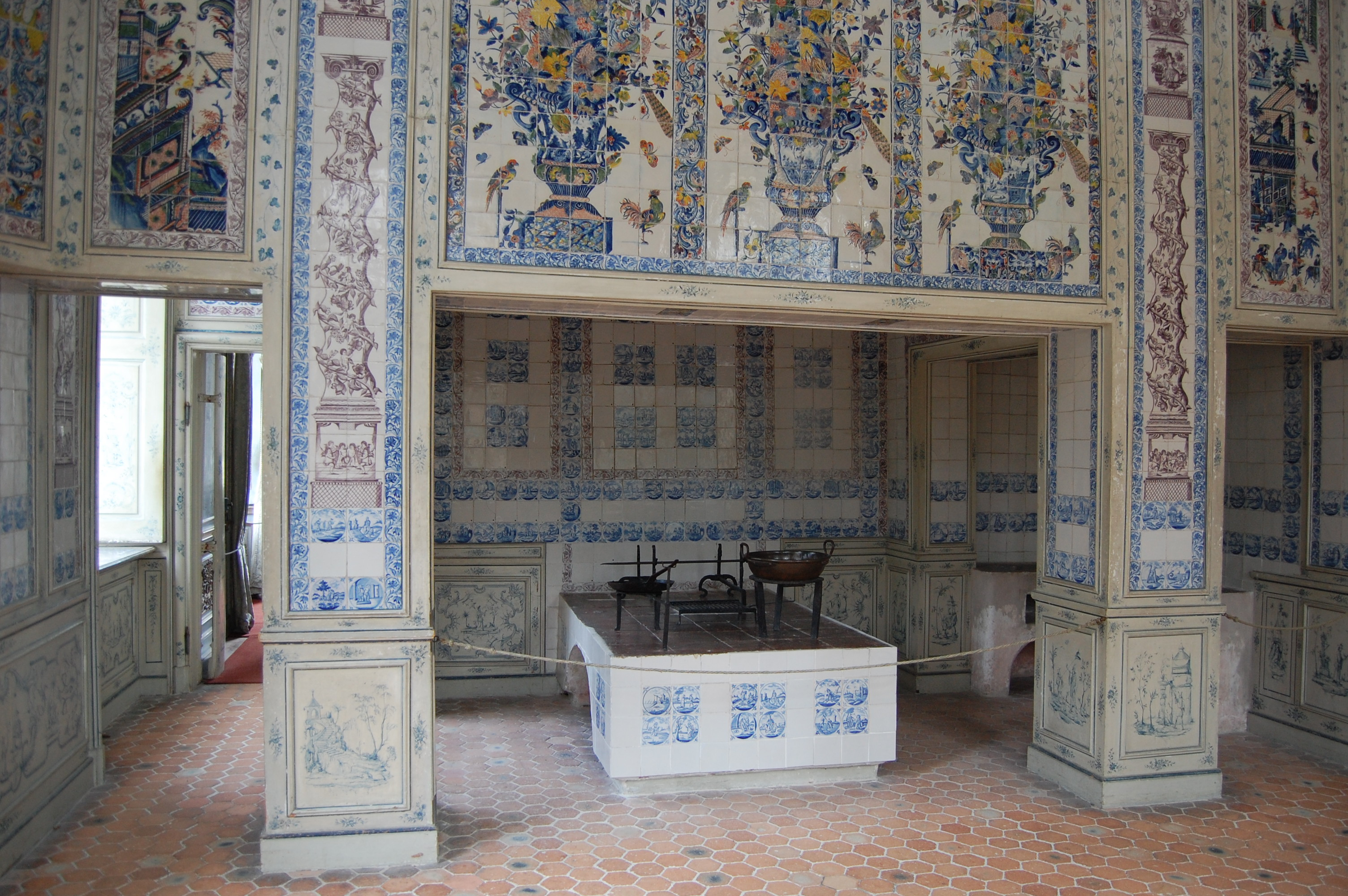
Kitchen of the Amalienburg

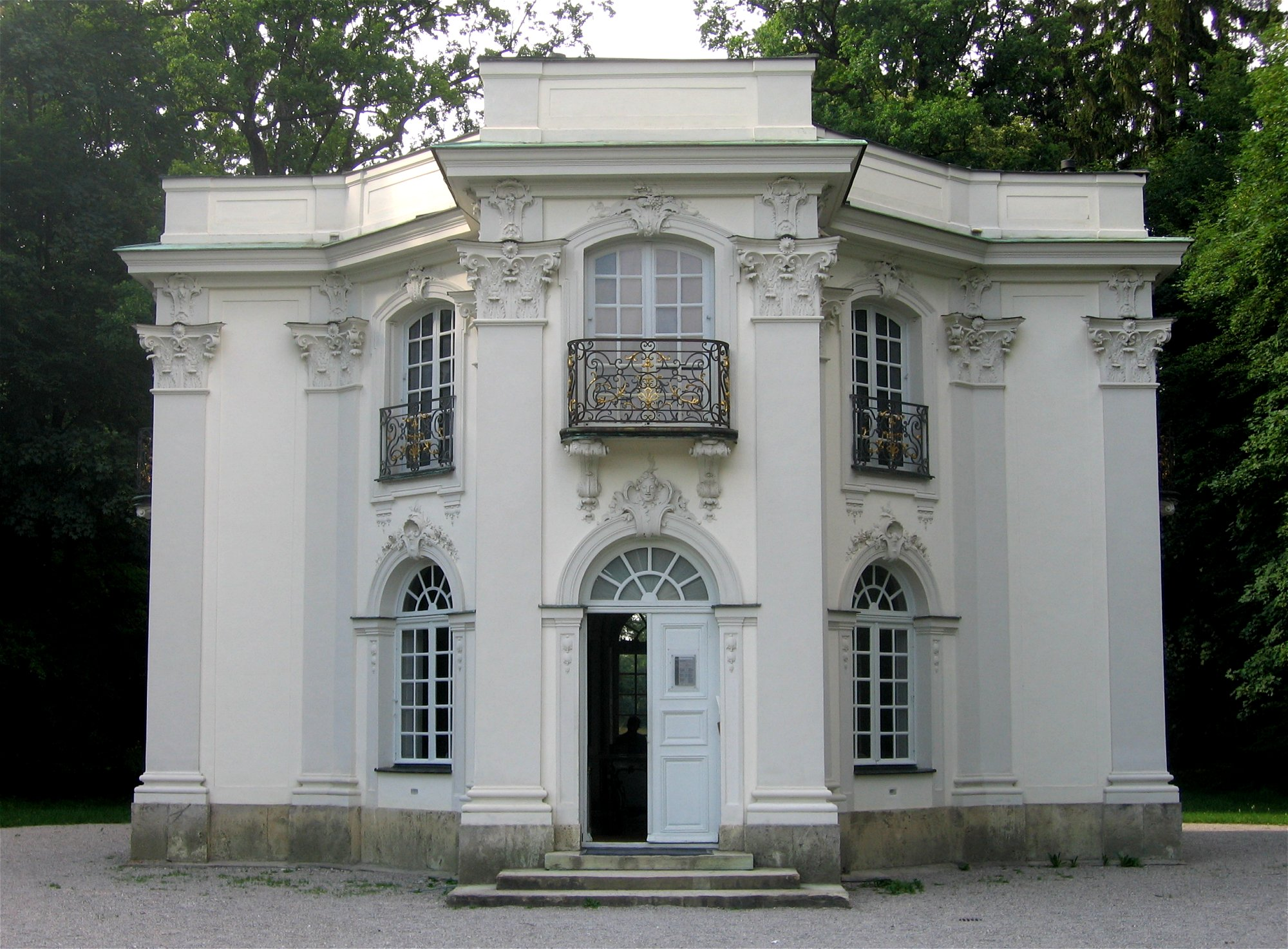
Pagodenburg, royal teahouse

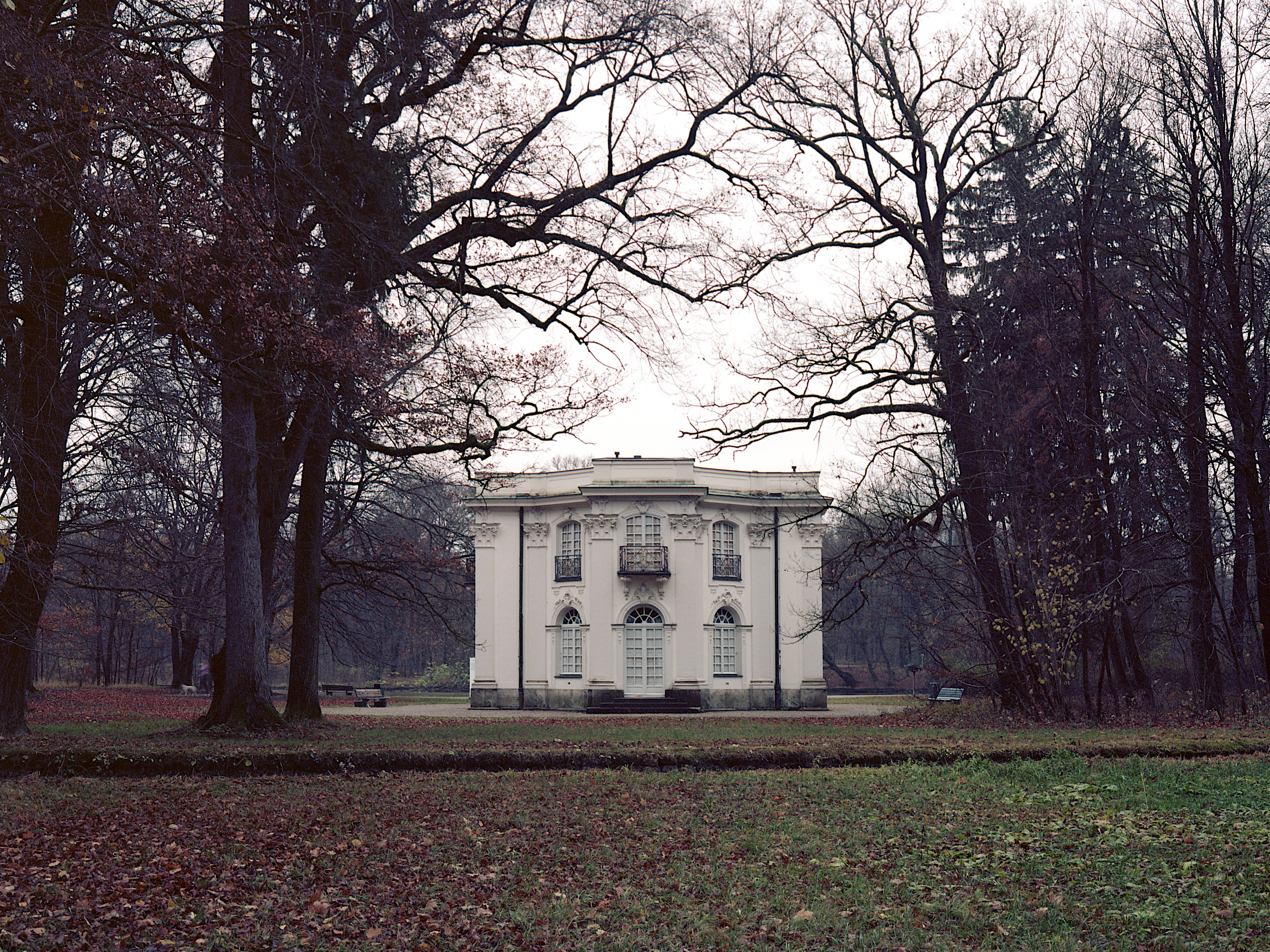
Pagodenburg, Nymphenburg Palace, Munich 2013

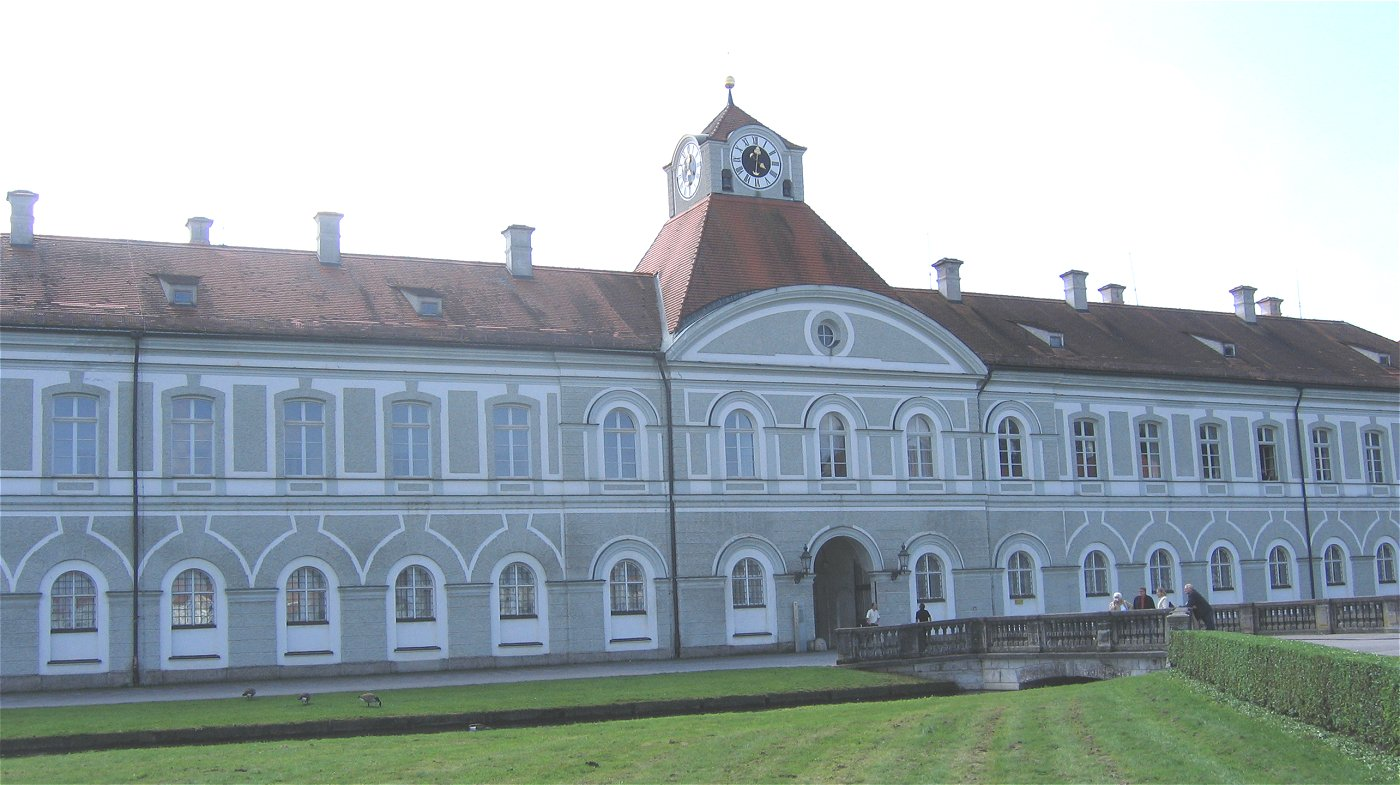
Court Stables

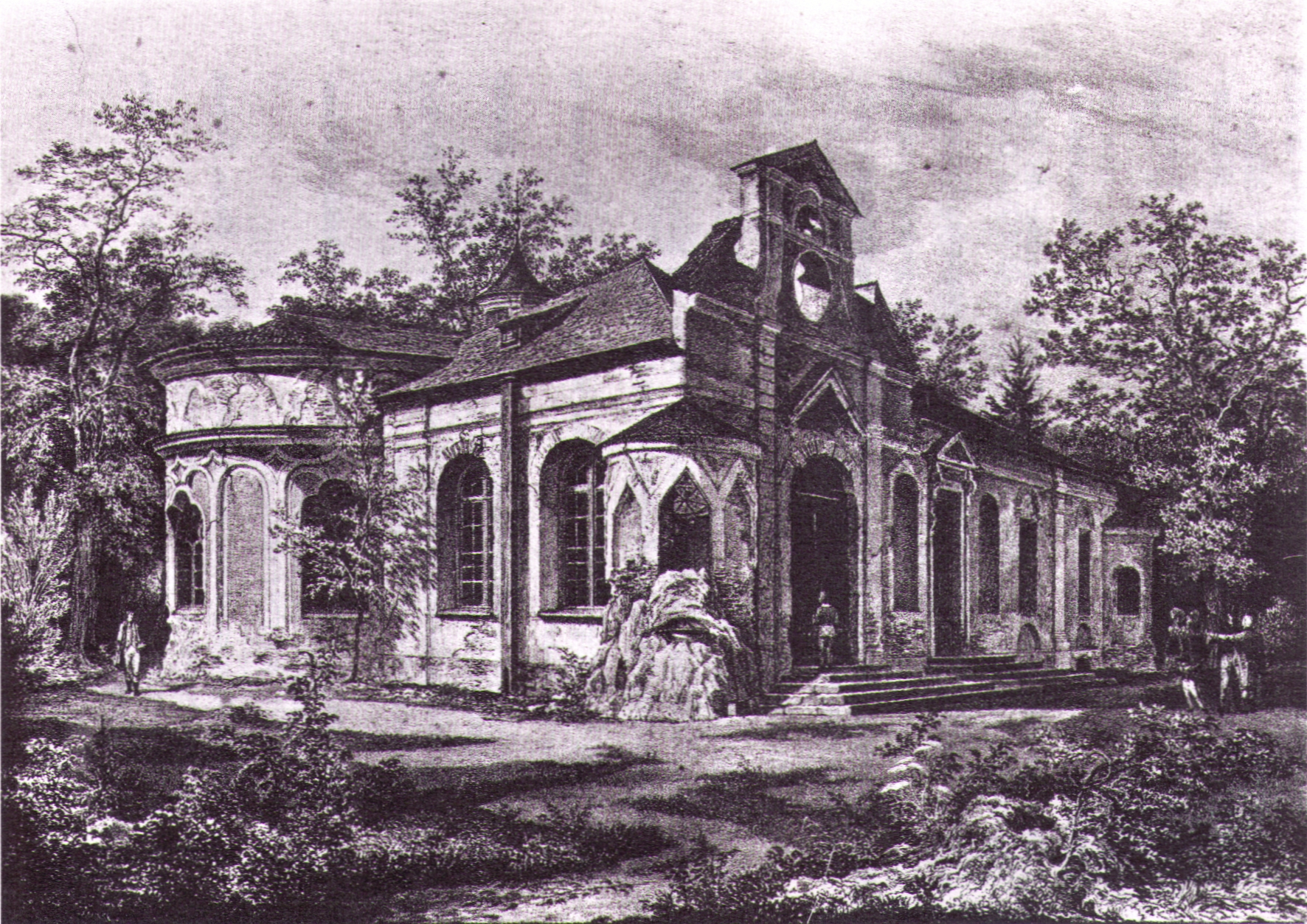
Magdalenenklause, royal hermitage, after Carl August Lebschée

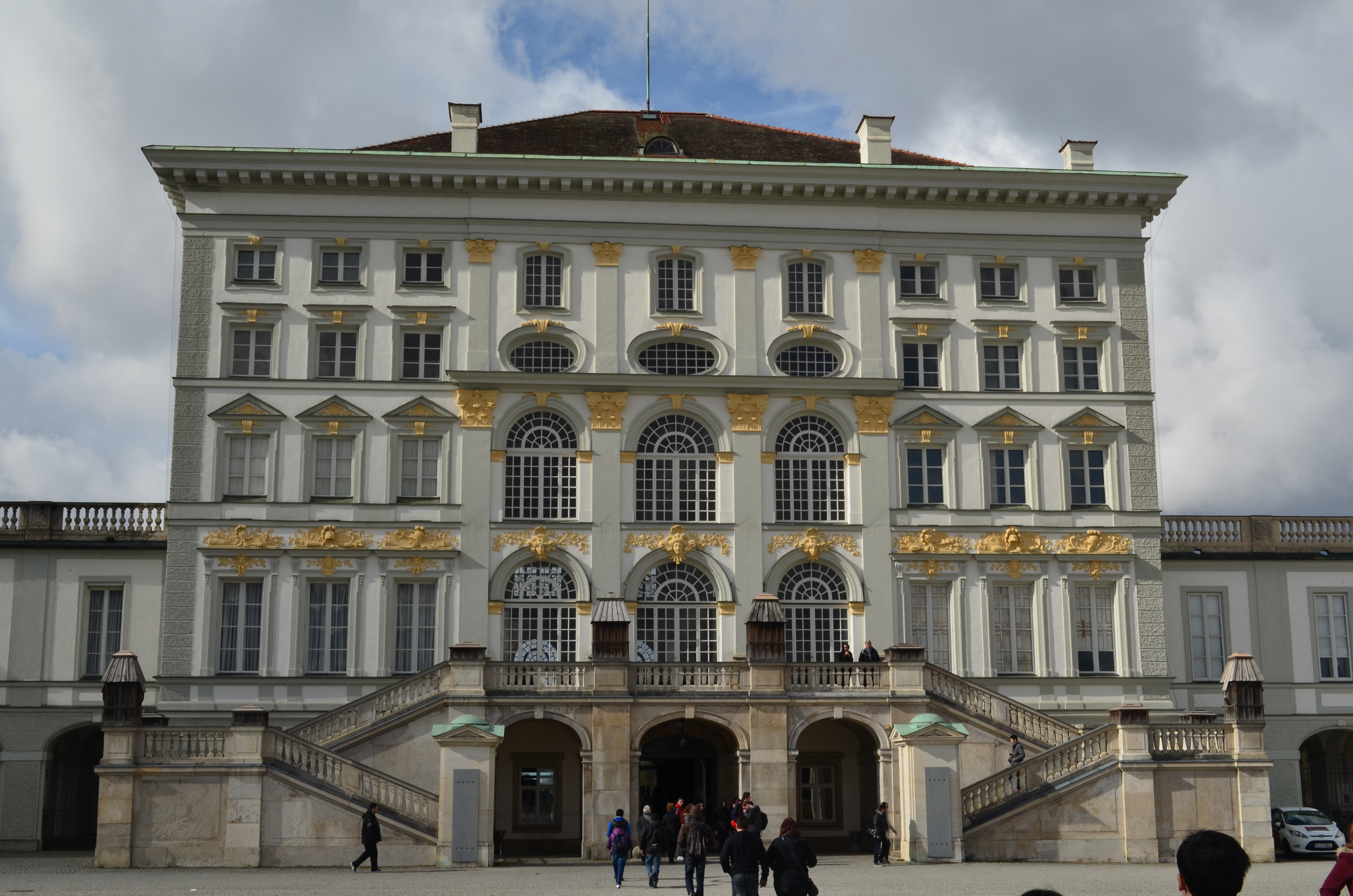
Nymphenburg Palace, Munich, Germany

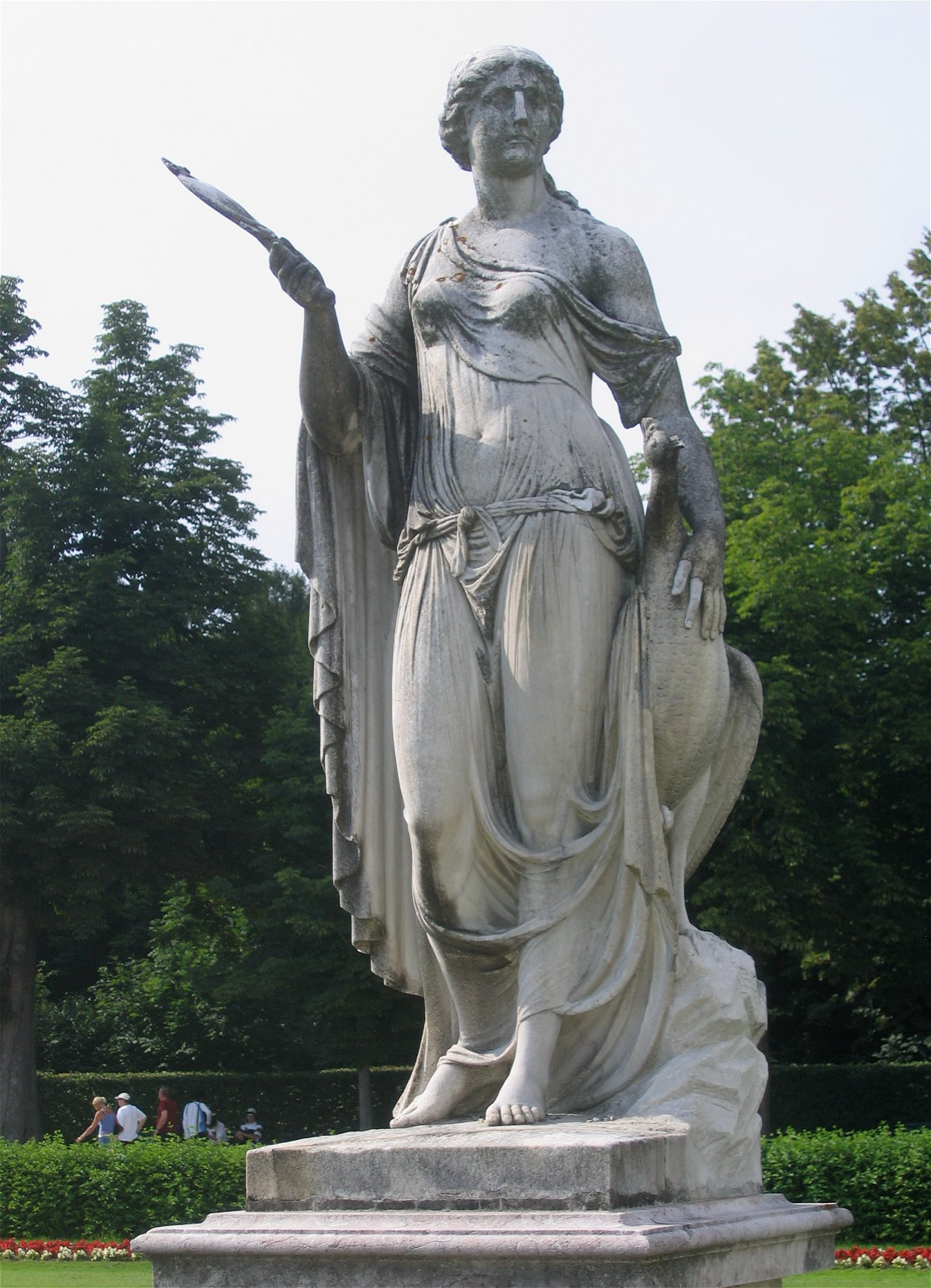
Juno by Dominik Auliczek

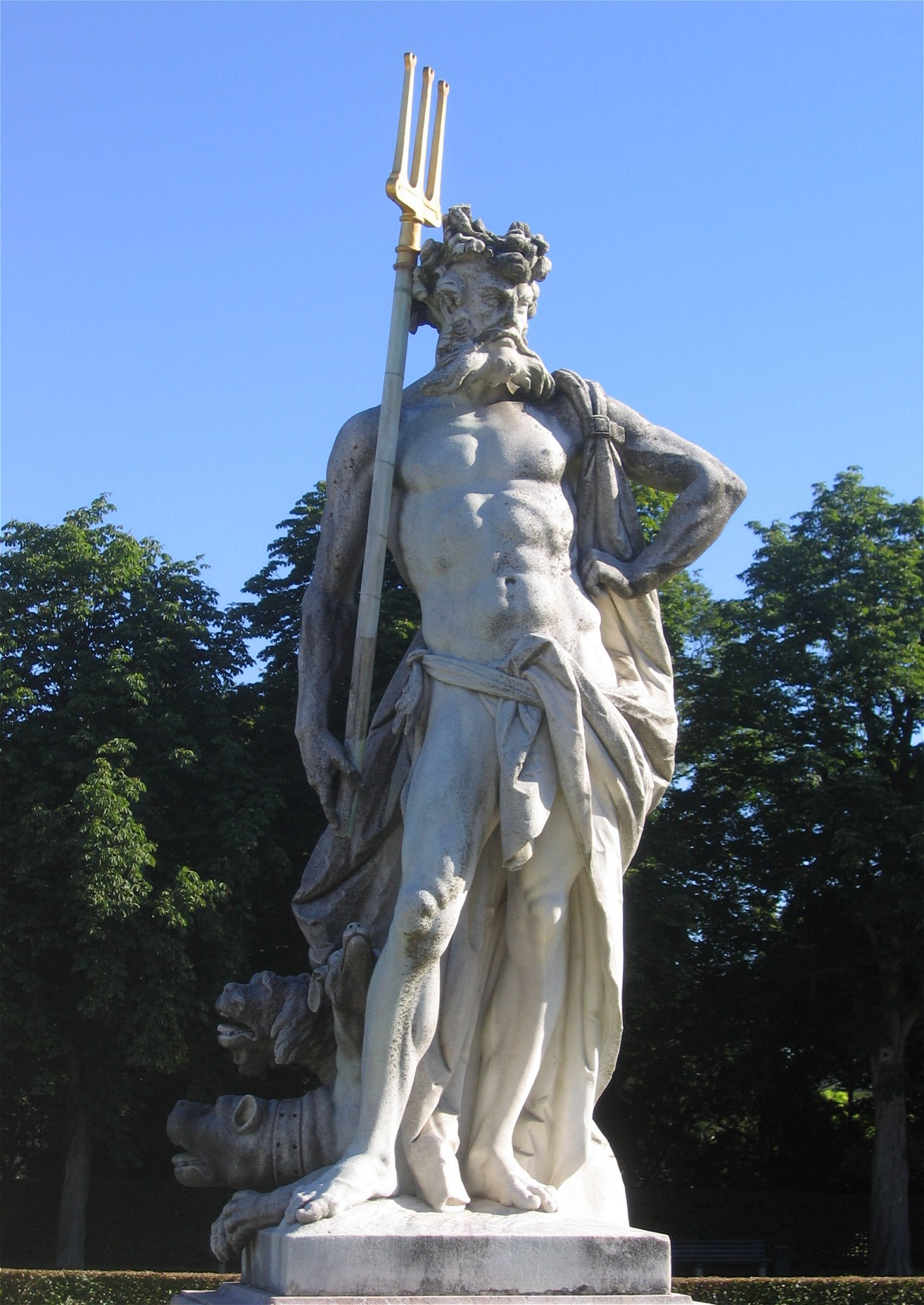
Pluto Dominik Auliczek

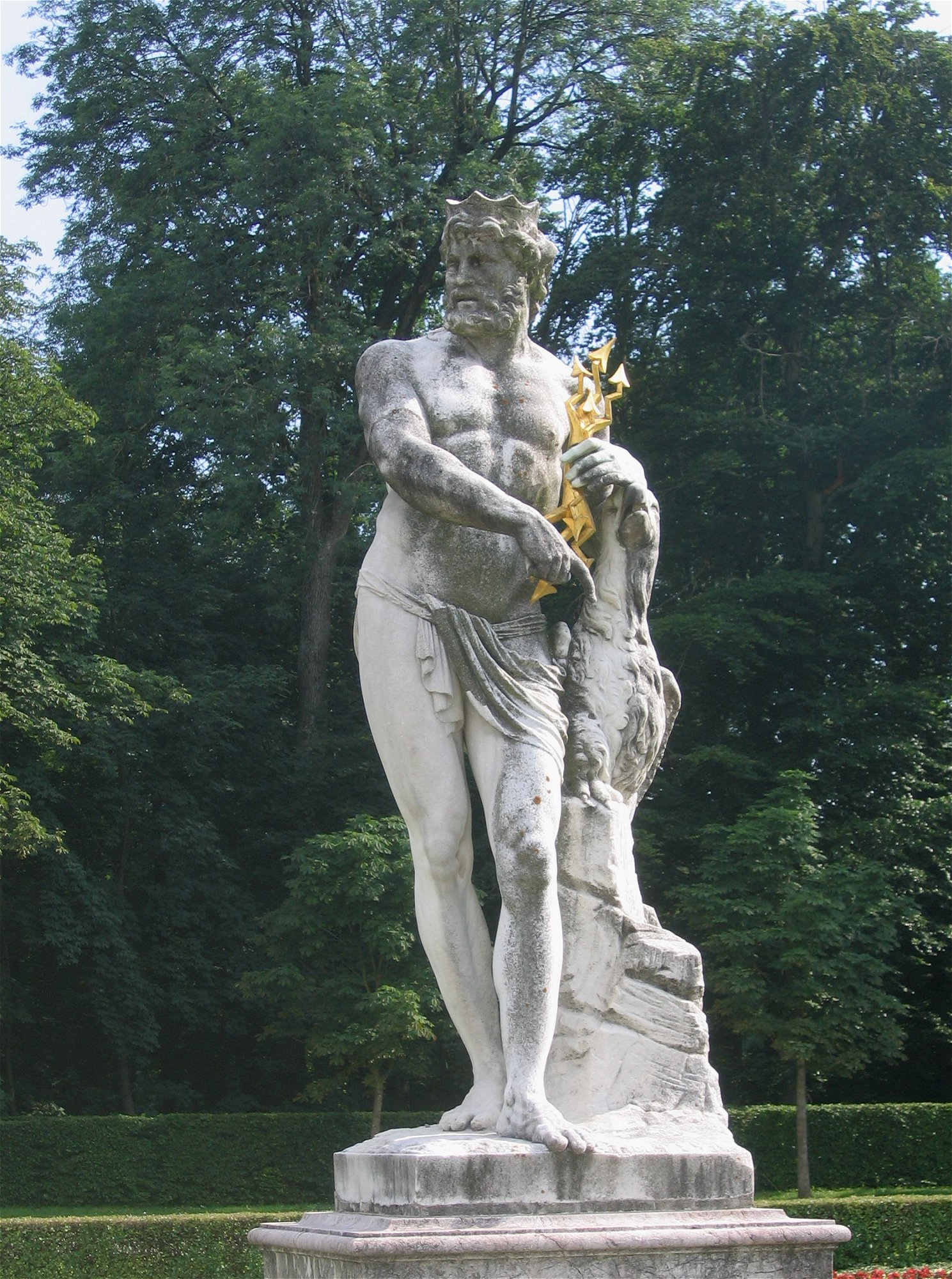
Jupiter Dominik Auliczek

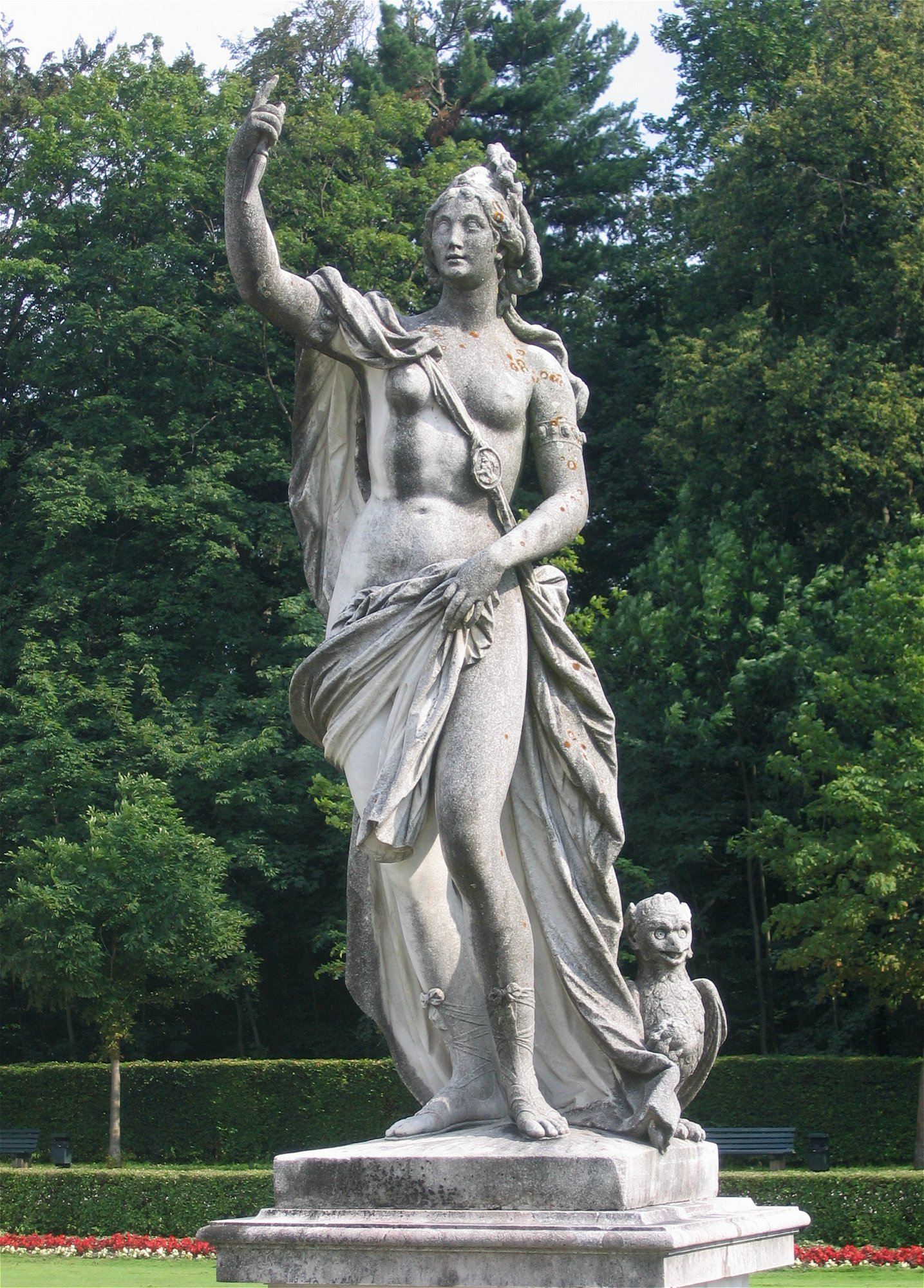
Proserpina Dominik Auliczek

== See also ==
- List of Baroque residences
- Nymphenburg Palace Park
- Nymphenburg Porcelain Manufactory
- 18th-century Western domes
