= Antonio Triva =

Italian painter

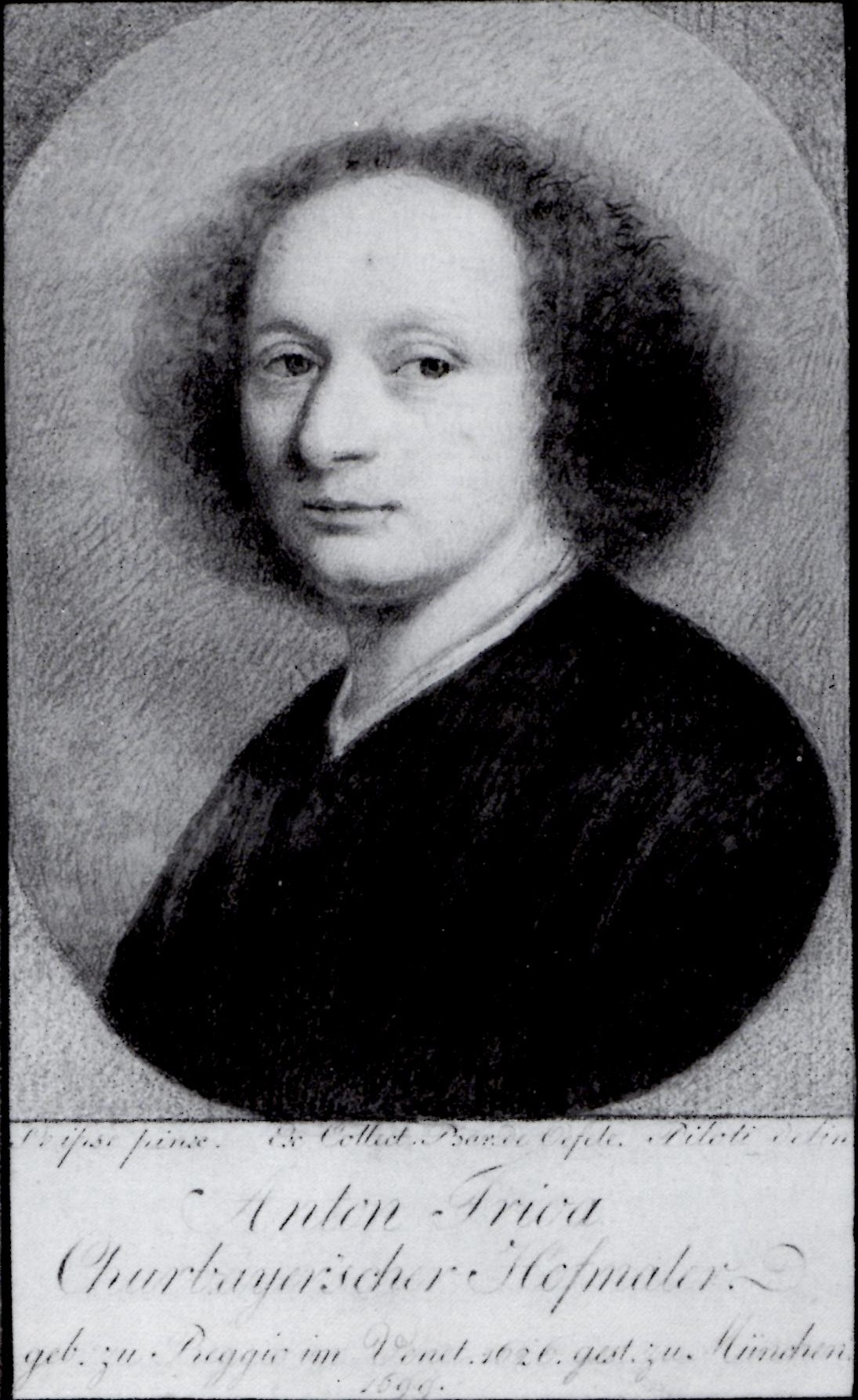
Portrait of Antonio Triva

Antonio Triva (1626 – circa 1669) was an Italian painter and engraver of the Baroque period.

== Biography ==
He was born in Reggio Emilia, and studied under Guercino in Bologna. Painted in Rome, Reggio, and Piacenza. He visited Venice, taking with him his sister Flaminia, who was also a painter.

He painted a main altarpiece depicting the Resurrection of Lazarus for the church of the Colombini in Padua. A painting depicting the Holy Family returning from Egypt was found in the church of Santa Cristina delle Carmelitane Scalze in Turin. He painted a Giacobedda, Mother of Moses and Aaron and an Esther and Assuerus, Moses near Roveto, and Jacob's dream above the portal for the church of the Blessed Virgin of Campagna in Piacenza. He painted a Birth of the Virgin found as the main altarpiece of the Church of San Pace in Brescia. He was invited to the court of the Elector of Bavaria, and died in Munich.

He painted as well with his left hand as with his right, and was a good etcher. Four etchings by him with the following titles:

- Susanna and the Elders.
- A Repose in Egypt.
- Virgin seated holding the Infant Jesus.
- Allegory with young Man looking in a Mirror, and seeing Sensuality, the Furies, and Death.

All these are signed with his name. Fussli mentions five more; four views in Italy, and a frontispiece to a book.
