= Giuseppe Artari =

Giuseppe Artari (1697 – 19 January 1771) was an Italian stuccoist. He was born the son of the stuccoist Giovanni Battista Artaria at Arogno, near Lugano.

From 1731 the 1760 he was in the service of the Archbishop-Elector of Cologne Clemens August of Bavaria and decorated the Augustusburg and Falkenlust Palaces, Brühl (1731–1733 and 1748–1757), the Buen Retiro, Bonn (today destroyed), and the Poppelsdorf Palace in Bonn (from 1744, today destroyed).

== Selected works ==
- ca. 1715: Duncombe Park, North Yorkshire
- before 1720: Cannons, Middlesex: chapel ceiling, together with Giovanni Bagutti (destroyed)
- 1720: Orleans House, Twickenham: octagon, together with Giovanni Bagutti
- 1720s: Houghton Hall, Norfolk
- 1722–1726: St Martin-in-the-Fields, London, together with Giovanni Bagutti
- 1723–1724: St Peter, Vere Street, London, together with Giovanni Bagutti
- 1725: Ditchley Park, Oxfordshire, together stuccoists Francesco Vassalli and Francesco Leone Serena
- before 1729: Clandon Park House, West Clandon, Surrey: ceiling (attributed)
- ca. 1730: Barnsley Park, Barnsley, Gloucestershire: hall and staircase, together with Giovanni Bagutti
- 1731–1733: Falkenlust Palace, Brühl
- ca. 1742–1744 or 1744–1745: Radcliffe Camera, Oxford: dome, together with Charles Stanley
- 1748–1757: Augustusburg Palace, Brühl
- Buen Retiro, Bonn (destroyed)
- from 1744: Poppelsdorf Palace, Bonn, together with Carlo Pietro Morsegno (destroyed)
- 1750–1752: St. Clemens's Church, Münster
- 1754–1757: Erbdrostenhof, Münster
- house at Kettenplatz 2, Paderborn
