= Johann Heinrich Roth =

German architect

Johann Heinrich Jakob Roth (also Franz Heinrich) (31 March 1729 – 19 October 1780) was a German master builder of the 18th century.

== Life ==
Born in Bad Mergentheim, he was the son of the court architect Franz Joseph Roth from Cologne. He worked mainly on buildings of the German Order, such as Mergentheim Palace. He also learned the basics of architecture from his father. Elector Clemens August of Bavaria supported him. This enabled him to continue his education in Paris. In 1754, he became a master builder and in 1759 a court chamber councillor.

Even before he was a regular master builder, he accompanied the Elector and Grand Master to Mergentheim in 1750. There he built a provisional wooden comedy and opera house in the castle courtyard. He created the stucco work in the Salle de gardes in the Augustusburg and Falkenlust Palaces, Brühl in 1754. He also designed the Schloss Herzogsfreude in the Kottenforst near Bonn. A major work is the late Baroque Jesuitenkirche in Büren. Around 1775 he worked as an advisor on the extension of the Residenzschloss in Münster. At about the same time, he rebuilt Burg Lüftelberg in Meckenheim into a castle. In 1779, he created the Electoral Palace, Bonn.

== Work ==
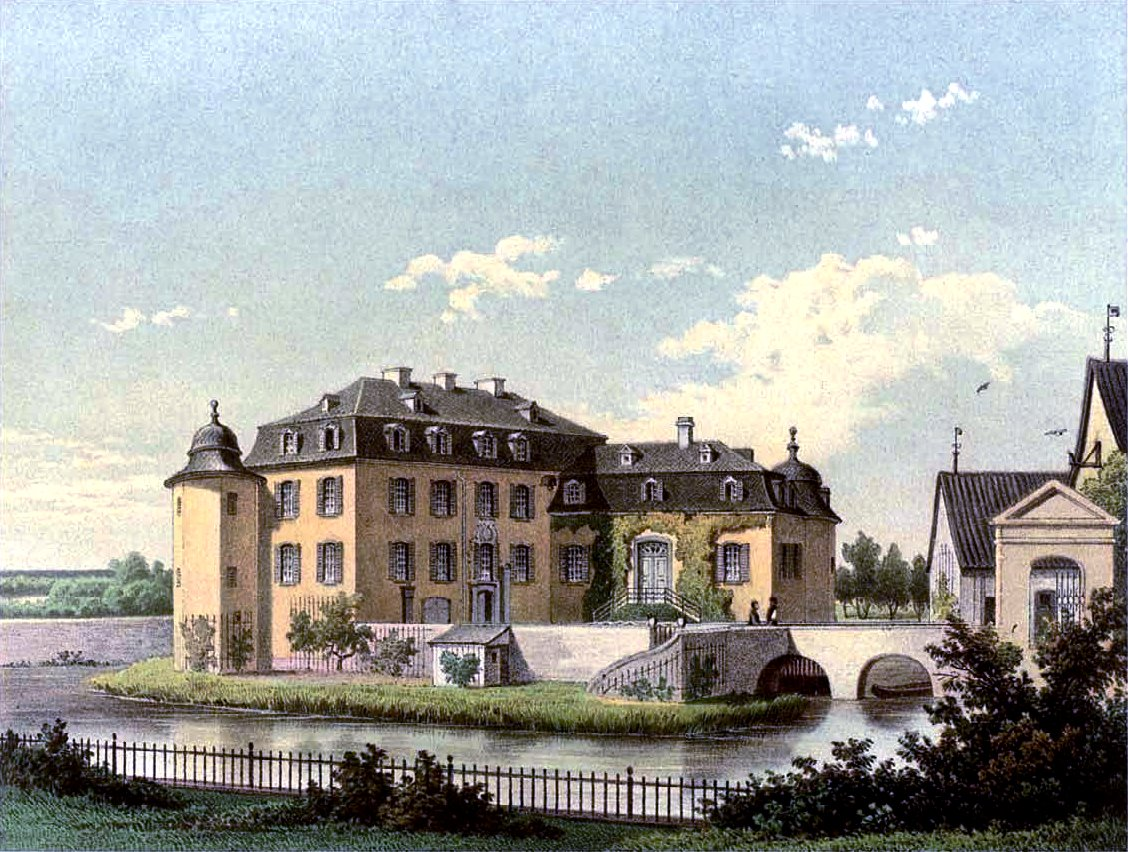
Schloss Lüftelberg

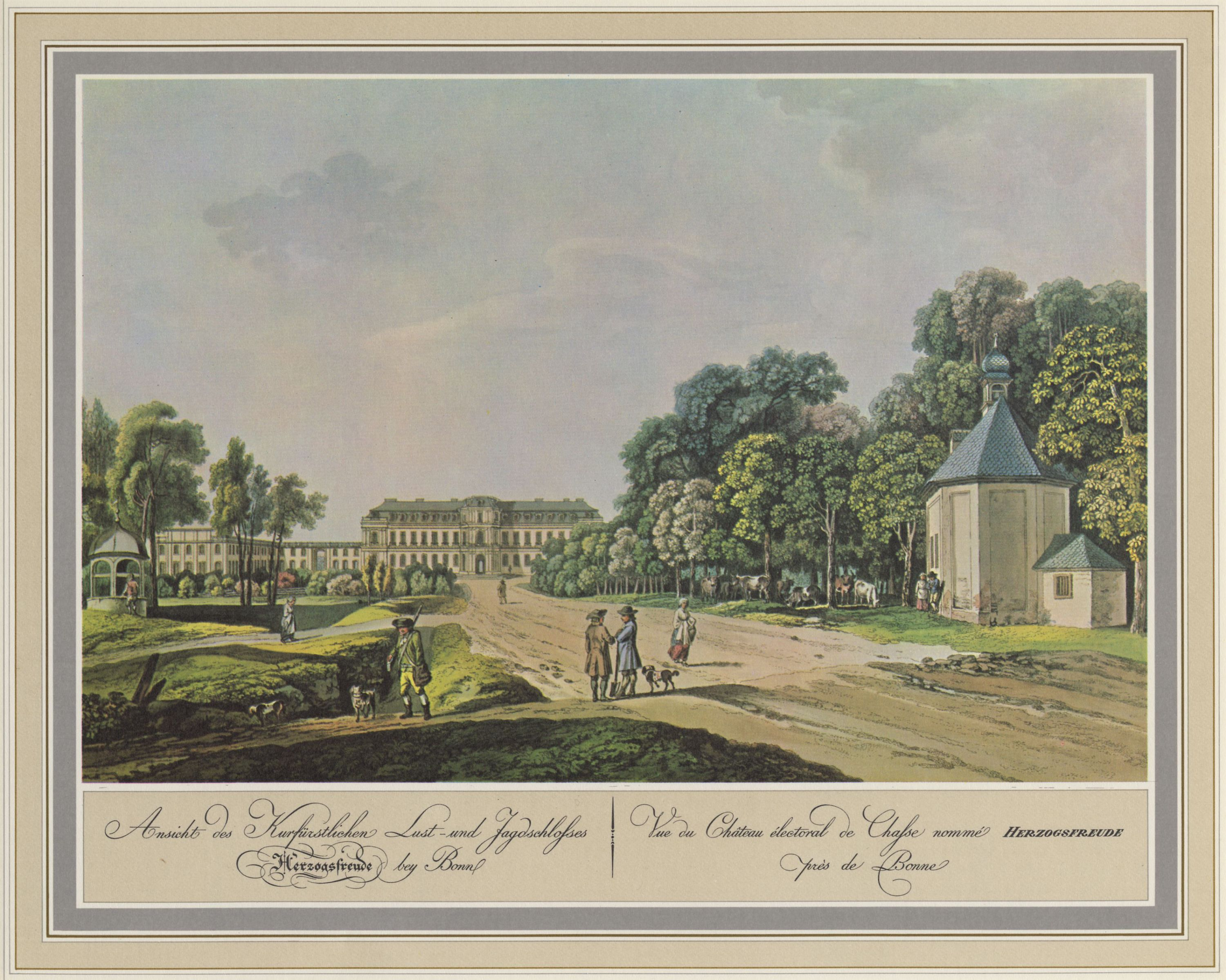
Schloss Herzogsfreude

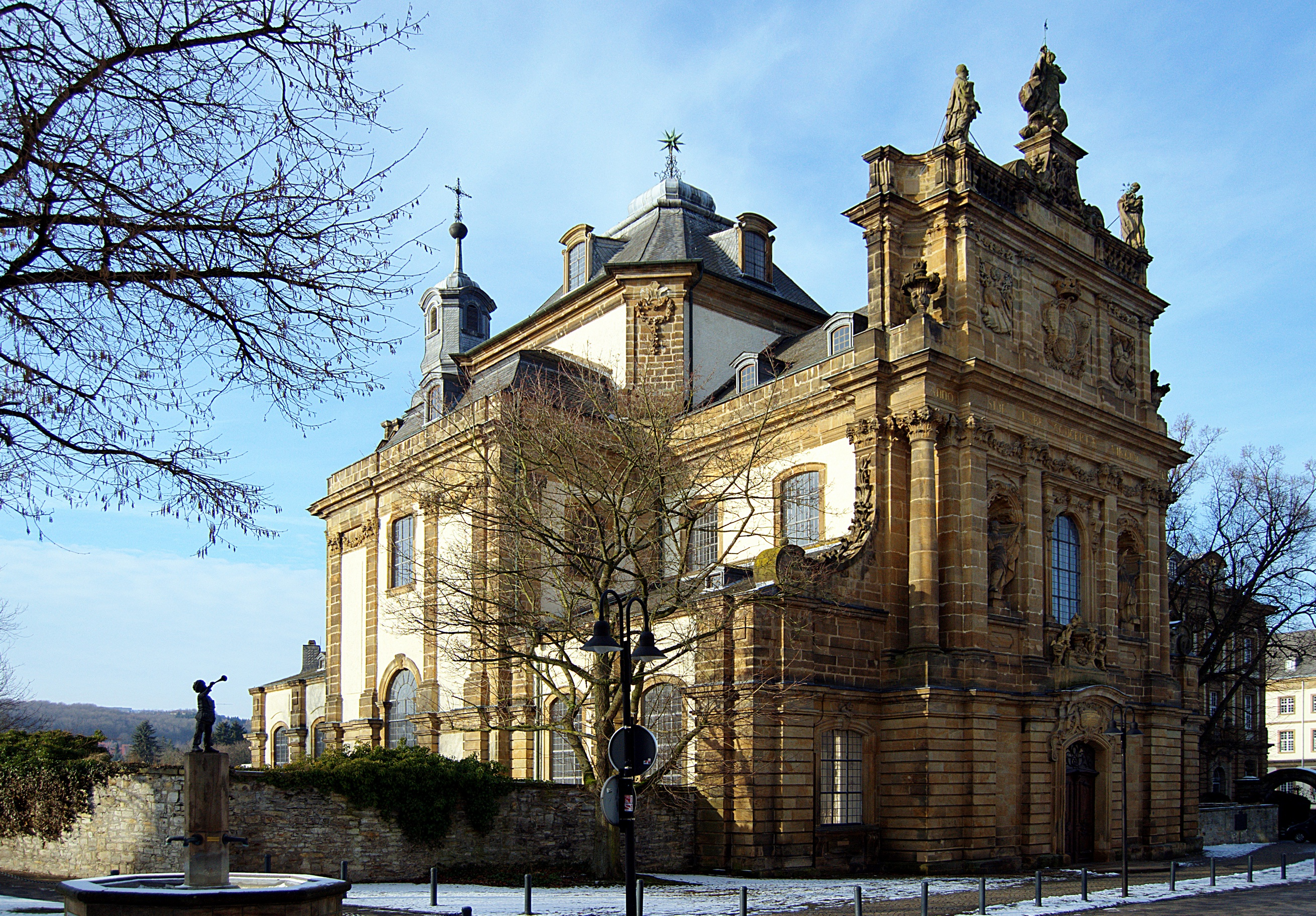
Jesuitenkirche Büren
