= Clemenswerth Palace =

Former hunting lodge of Clemens-August of Bavaria in Lower Saxony

Coordinates: 52°50′18″N 7°32′14″E

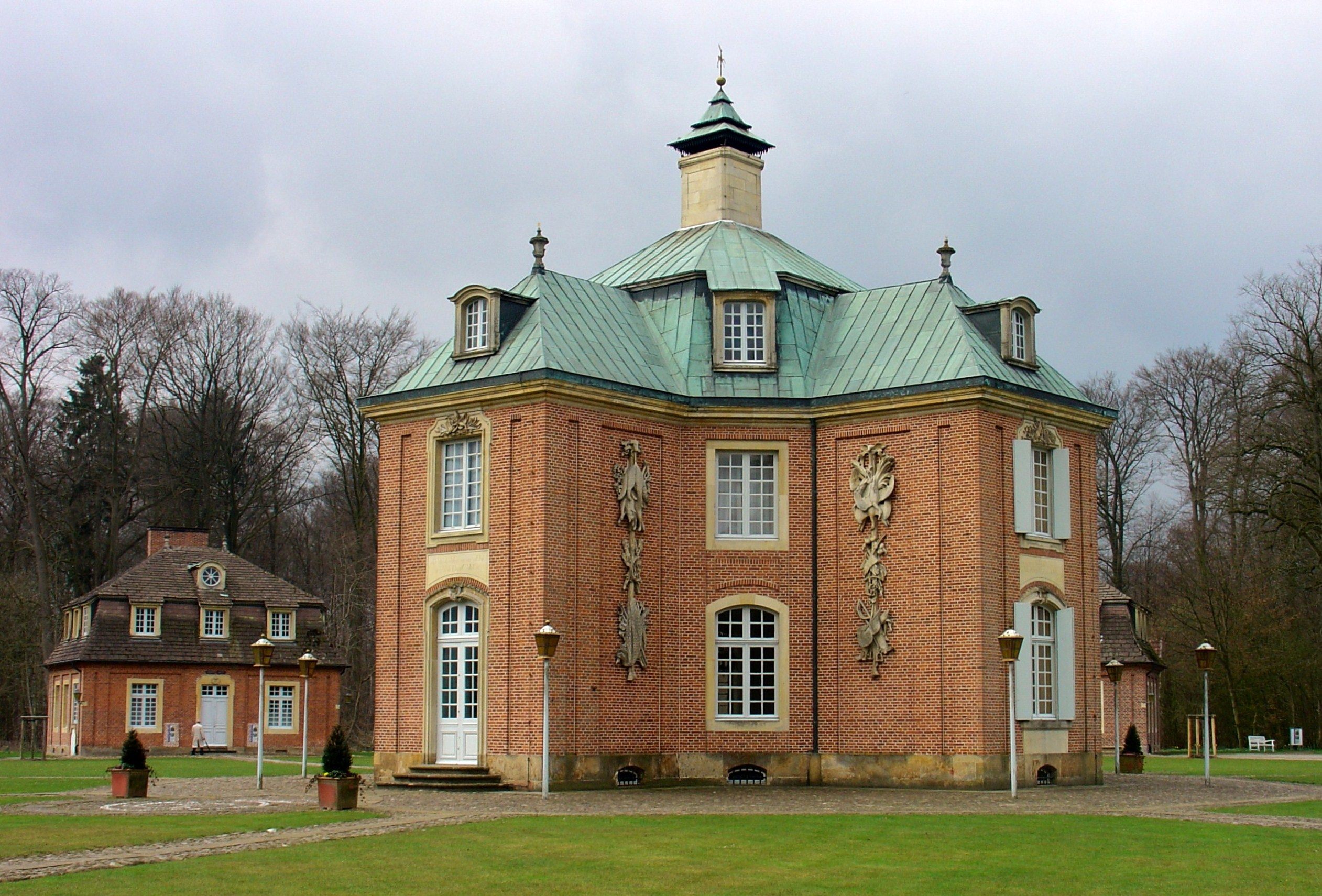
Schloss Clemenswerth

Clemenswerth Palace (Schloss Clemenswerth) is a former hunting lodge (Jagdschloss) of the Prince-Bishops of Münster, located in the Emsland municipality of Sögel. This star-shaped Baroque complex—comprising a large main pavilion and eight smaller subsidiary pavilions—was built between 1737 and 1747, commissioned by Clemens August of Bavaria and designed by Johann Conrad Schlaun. Highlights include the ceremonial hall, the palace chapel, and the palace park.

== Bibliography ==
- (in German) Emsländischer Heimatbund (ed.): Clemenswerth – Schloss im Emsland. Sögel
- (in German) Emslandmuseum Schloss Clemenswerth - Ein Museum schafft sich eine gesteigerte Identität, in: Jahrbuch des Emsländischen Heimatbundes Bd. 56/2010, Sögel 2009, S. 295–302.
- Plagemann, Volker (1969). Die Jagdschlösser des Kurfürsten Clemens August – Falkenlust – Clemenswerth – Herzogsfreude (in German). Hamburg: Parey. p. 36.

== See also: Other palaces, residences and hunting lodges of Clemens August of Bavaria ==
- Schloss Ahaus
- Schloss Arnsberg
- Augustusburg and Falkenlust Palaces, Brühl
- Electoral Palace, Bonn
- Schloss Herzogsfreude
- Schloss Hirschberg near Arnsberg
- Schloss Liebenburg
- Mergentheim Palace
- Schloss Neuhaus in Paderborn
- Osnabrück Palace
- Poppelsdorf Palace in Bonn
- Schloss Sassenberg
- Vinea Domini in Bonn
- Amtshaus Wiedenbrück (also known as Burg Reckenberg)
