= Order of Saint Michael (Bavaria) =

Bavarian order of merit

Order of Merit of Saint Michael Verdienstorden vom Heiligen Michael
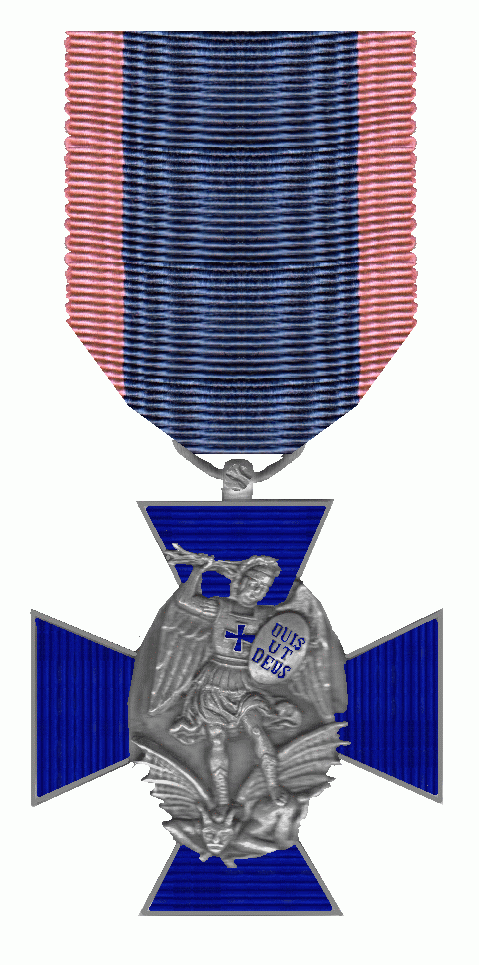

Awarded by Kingdom of Bavaria
- Type: before 1837: Military Order after 1837: Order of merit
- Established: Military Order: 29 September 1693; Order of Merit: 16 February 1837
- Royal house: House of Wittelsbach
- Religious affiliation: Roman Catholicism
- Motto: QUIS UT DEUS ("Who [is] like God")
- Status: No longer awarded
- Founder: Archbishop Joseph Clemens, Archbishop-Elector of Cologne
- Grades: Military Order: Knight Commander; Knight Officer; Knight; Order of Merit: 1st class with Grand Cross; 1st class 2nd class with star 2nd class Cross of Honour; 3rd class 4th class Cross of Merit; Medal of Merit

Precedence
- Next (higher): Order of Merit of the Bavarian Crown
- Next (lower): Bavarian Maximilian Order for Science and Art
- Ribbon of the order

The Order of Saint Michael (German: Orden zum Heiligen Michael), later Order of Merit of Saint Michael (German: Verdienstorden vom Heiligen Michael), was founded on 29 September 1693 by Joseph Clemens of Bavaria, then Archbishop-Elector of Cologne, as a military order. Its full name was Most Illustrious Military Order of Defenders of Divine Glory under the Protection of the Holy Archangel Michael. Initially, this order was only open to the Catholic nobility. Upon its institution, the order consisted of the Grand Master and three classes: Knight Commander, Knight Officer and Knight, divided in two divisions, spiritual and secular. The Grand Master and Knights Commander were bestowed with a breast star. The Knights Commander or Knights Grand Cross, officially limited to nine of the spiritual and the secular division each, constituted the chapter. The order has had four spiritual Knights Officers: chancellor, honorary chaplain, almoner, and sacristan, and the same amount of secular Knights Officers: marshal, treasurer, equerry, and chamberlain. The third class of Knights was limited to 18 spiritual and secular knights each, so the order ideally should have had 63 members, representing the age of the queen of angels.

The first headquarter on the order was located in the Godesburg in the Electorate of Cologne, from the 1750s in the Electoral Palace. Its Bavarian main church was St. Michael in Berg am Laim, Munich.

In 1808, the order was recognized by Maximilian I Joseph of Bavaria as an order of chivalry in the Kingdom of Bavaria, and the grade of Knights of Honour, limited to twelve recipients, mostly Protestants and literary commoners, was added to the third class. In 1813, the order received the official title of the Knightly House Order of St. Michael.

On 16 February 1837, Ludwig I of Bavaria transformed the military order into an order of merit, called Order of Merit of St. Michael, divided into three classes: Knight Grand Cross, Knight Commander, and Knight. The physical appearance of the decorations also changed at this time. In 1855, the classes of Knight Grand Commander and Knight 2nd class were introduced. In 1887, according to a proposal of Crailsheim, the order got reformed and divided into Knights 1st, 2nd, 3rd and 4th class; a cross of merit and a silver medal were affiliated with the order.

== List of grandmasters ==
1. 1693–1723: Joseph Clemens of Bavaria, Archbishop-Elector of Cologne
2. 1723–1761: Clemens August of Bavaria, Archbishop-Elector of Cologne and Grand Master of the Teutonic Order
3. 1761–1763: Johann Theodor of Bavaria, Prince-Bishop of Regensburg, Prince-Bishop of Freising, and Prince-Bishop of Liège.
4. 1763–1770: Duke Clement Francis of Bavaria
5. 1770–1777: Maximilian III Joseph, Elector of Bavaria
6. 1778–1795: Charles II August, Duke of Zweibrücken
7. 1795–1799: Maximilian Joseph, Duke of Zweibrücken
8. 1799–1837: Duke Wilhelm in Bavaria

After the death of Duke Wilhelm and the transformation into an order of merit, the King of Bavaria as the fount of honor was de facto Grand Master.

== See also ==
- List of ecclesiastical decorations
