= Arboretum Park Härle =

Nonprofit arboretum in Germany

Coordinates: 50°42′55″N 7°10′09″E

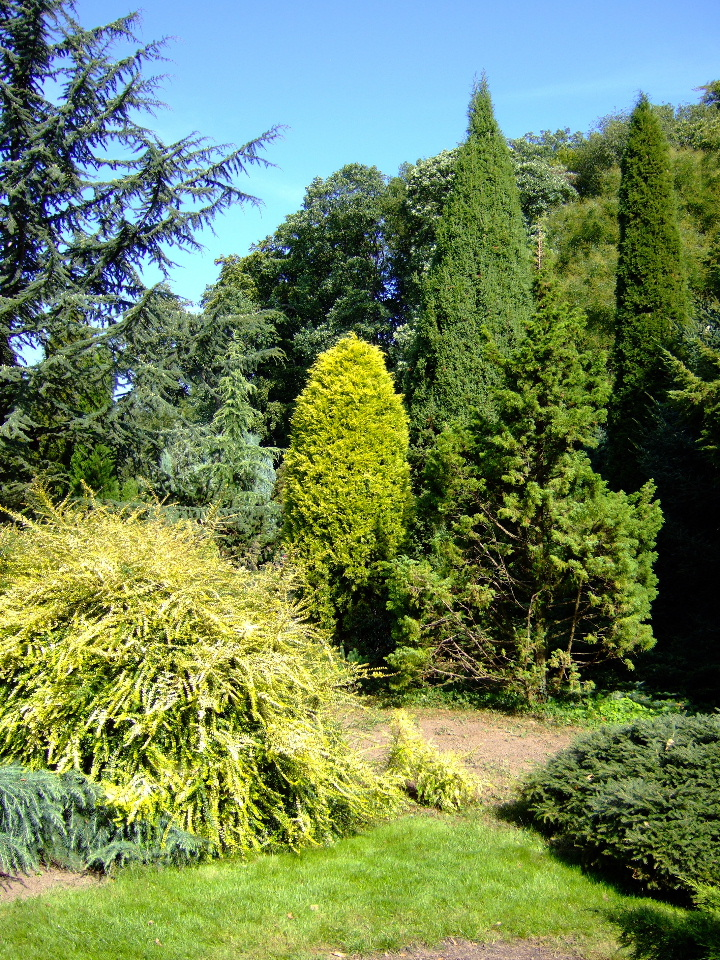
Arboretum Park Härle

The Arboretum Park Härle (4.7 hectares) is a nonprofit arboretum located on the slopes of the Rhine Valley between Bonn and the Seven Mountains at Büchelstraße 40, Bonn, North Rhine-Westphalia, Germany. It is open twice a month during the warmer months; admission is free.

The arboretum dates back to 1870, when the director of the Rheinische Eisenbahn-Gesellschaft created a large country house in the English half-timbered style, with park plantings that still remain, including two cedars (Cedrus libani and Cedrus atlantica), a Ginkgo biloba, a Sequoiadendron, and an incense cedar (Calocedrus decurrens). In 1921, the property was acquired by jurist Dr. Carl Härle, who actively planted a wide variety of trees and shrubs. After his death in 1950, his daughters Maria and Regina Härle maintained the property, and ultimately willed it to a nonprofit foundation in 2000.

Today's arboretum consists of three distinct parts: the old park with old buildings, the new park on the grounds of a former nursery, and the extensive woods with lawn and fruit trees. All told, the arboretum contains more than 800 varieties of trees and shrubs, with extensive collections of Chamaecyparis, Juniperus, Taxus, and Thuja, as well as roses and fine specimens of Acer griseum, Cornus controversa, Cupressus sempervirens, Juniperus deppeana, Pseudotsuga menziesii, and Quercus pyrenaica.

== See also ==
- Botanische Gärten der Friedrich-Wilhelms-Universität Bonn
- List of botanical gardens in Germany
