= Botanical Garden, Bonn =

Botanical garden in Bonn, Germany

Coordinates: 50°43′29″N 7°05′30″E

Botanische Gärten der Friedrich-Wilhelms-Universität Bonn
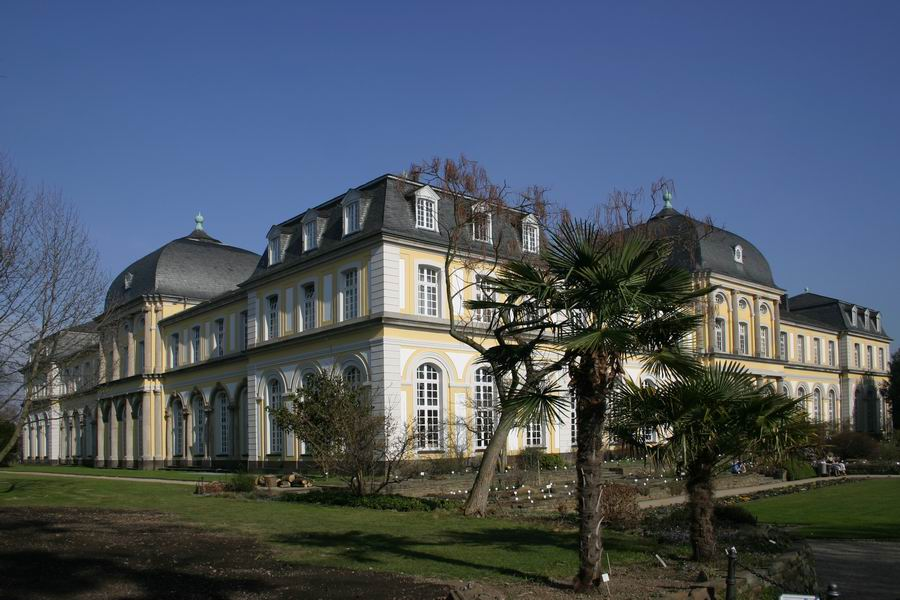
- Poppelsdorf Palace in the Botanischer Garten Bonn
- Location: Meckenheimer Allee 171, Bonn, North Rhine-Westphalia, Germany
- Type: Botanical Garden
- Website: www.botgart.uni-bonn.de/en

The Botanische Gärten der Friedrich-Wilhelms-Universität Bonn (6.5 hectares open to public, 3 hectares private), also known as the Botanischer Garten Bonn, is a botanical garden and arboretum maintained by the University of Bonn.

It is open except Saturdays in the warmer months; admission is free.

== History ==
The gardens were originally castle grounds for the Archbishop of Cologne, dating to about 1340, which circa 1650 were fashioned into a Renaissance garden. In 1720, the site was reworked as a Baroque garden, setting the basic structure of today's garden, with the rococo Poppelsdorf Palace completed in 1746 by Archbishop Clemens August.

When the University of Bonn was founded in 1818, its first garden director, Dr. Christian Gottfried Daniel Nees von Esenbeck (1776-1858), began to focus the garden on scientific botany. By 1900 the garden was second only to Berlin's within Germany, but it was completely destroyed in World War II. Reconstruction began after the war and was completed in 1979–1984 with the construction of two conservatories.

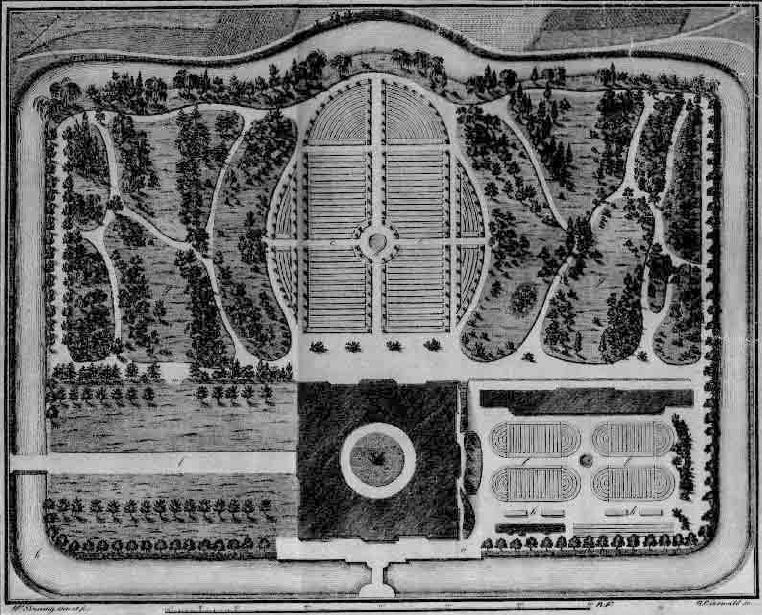
Botanischer Garten Bonn, 1823

== Collection ==
Today the garden cultivates about 8,000 plant species, ranging from endangered local species from the Rhineland such as Lady's Slipper Orchids to protected species such as Sophora toromiro from Easter Island. Its outdoor gardens, containing about 3,000 species, are organized as follows:

- Arboretum - 700 species of woody plants, including fine specimens of Araucaria araucana, Ginkgo biloba, Nyssa, Pinus bungeana, and Torreya, as well as old specimens of Taxodium distichum.
- Systematic section - about 1,200 species arranged in beds reflecting their evolutionary relationships; notable specimens include Passiflora caerulea, Trachycarpus fortunei, and Umbellularia californica.
- Geographical section - plants grouped by geographical origin.
- Biotope section - the most important locally occurring plant communities, including endangered species from the Bonn region.

The garden also contains about 0.5 hectares of greenhouse area, including a major conservatory (2,500 m^{2}) completed in 1984. Roughly 3,000 species are cultivated in public areas as follows:

- Fern house - tree ferns and other indigenous plants from cool cloud forests on tropical mountains.
- Mediterranean house - winter shelter for subtropical plants from the Mediterranean, South Africa, California, and Australia.
- Palm house - epiphytes and large rain forest plants such as bananas and bamboos.
- Succulent house - Succulents including new world cacti and agaves, and old world Aloes and Euphorbias, including Welwitschia mirabilis.
- Victoria house - giant water lily (Victoria regia), Nymphaea, Aristolochia and Passiflora, tropical bog plants, and a fine specimen of Amorphophallus titanum.
- Smaller houses including a carnivorous plant house, geophyte house, and two orchid houses.

== See also ==
- Arboretum Park Härle
- List of botanical gardens in Germany
