= Schloss Herzogsfreude =

Former hunting lodge near Bonn, Germany

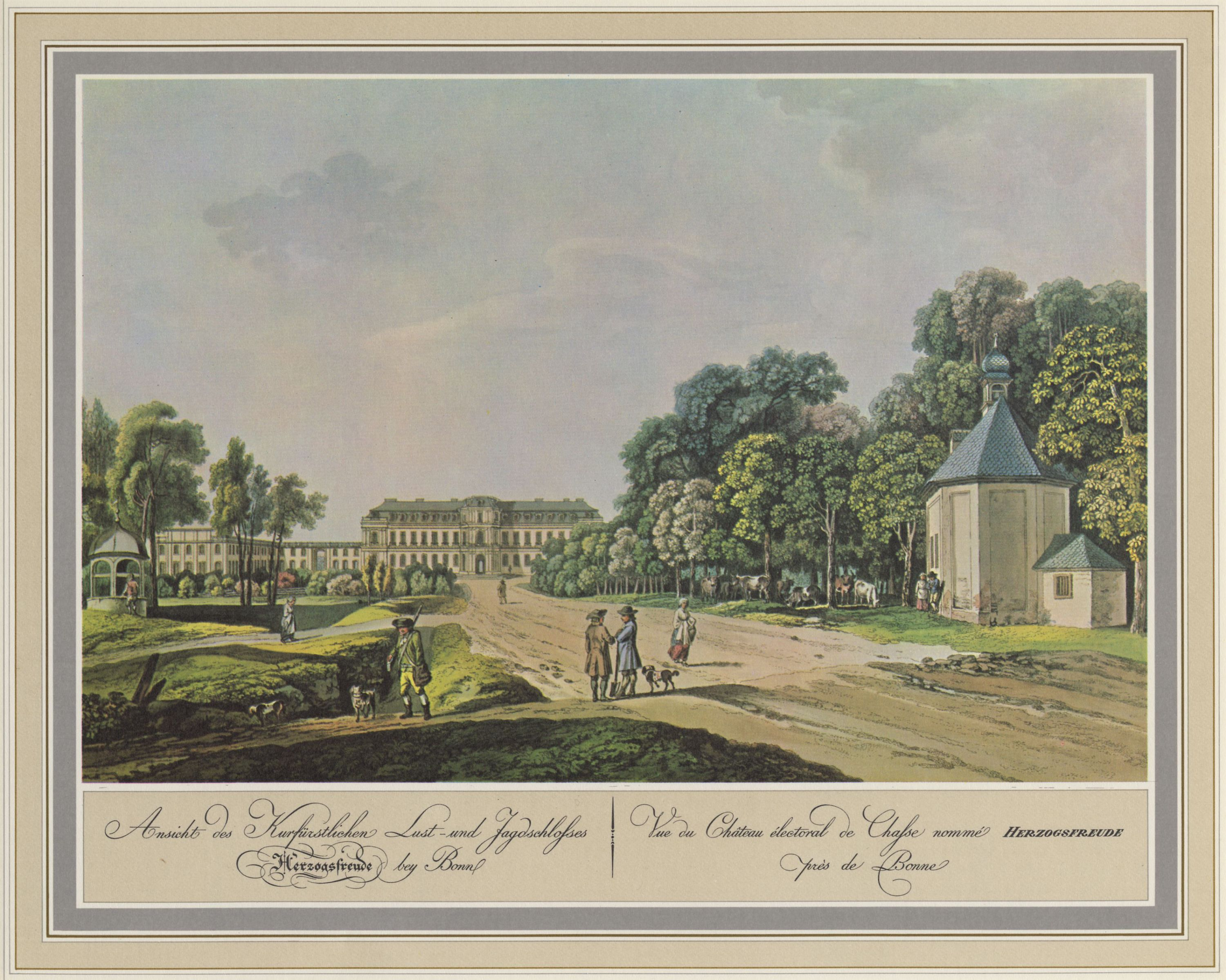
Schloss Herzogsfreude at the end of the 18th century

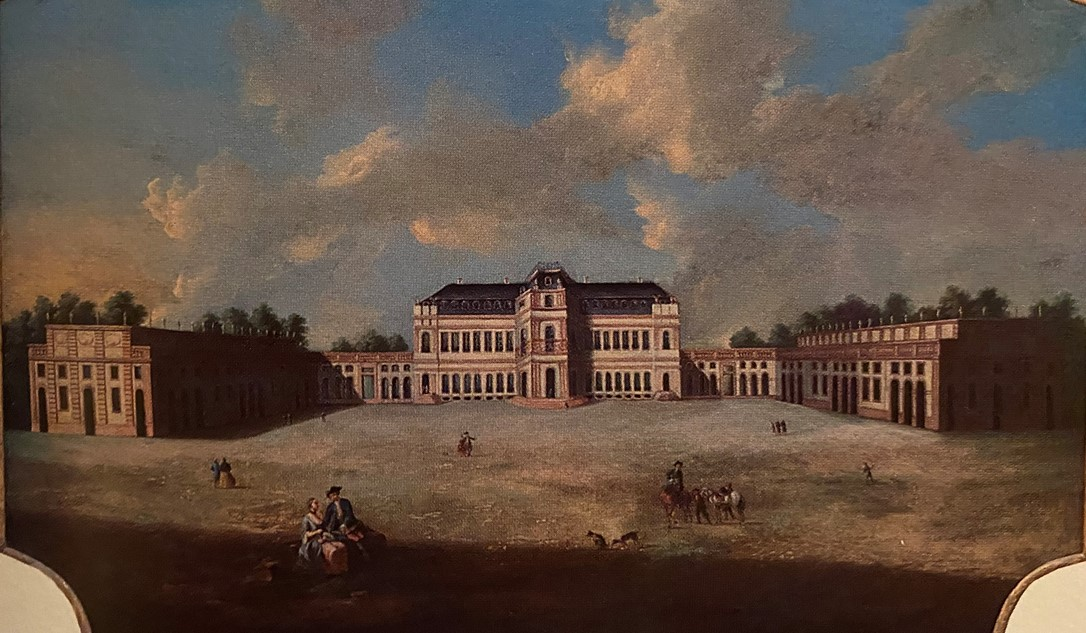
Schloss Gymnich has a supraporte depicting Schloss Herzogsfreude

Schloss Herzogsfreude (also known as Joy-le-Duc, the duke’s pleasure) was a late baroque style palace in Röttgen, now a district of Bonn, North Rhine-Westphalia, Germany. Built as a hunting lodge between 1753 and 1761 for Clemens August of Bavaria, Prince-Elector and Archbishop of Cologne, it stood at the heart of the Kottenforst forest and served as a stage for his elaborate par force hunts. The palace was demolished in 1804 during the Napoleonic era.

Today, only the geometric network of forest avenues and a bronze scale model on the Schlossplatz in Röttgen recall its existence.

== History ==
=== Clemens August of Bavaria ===
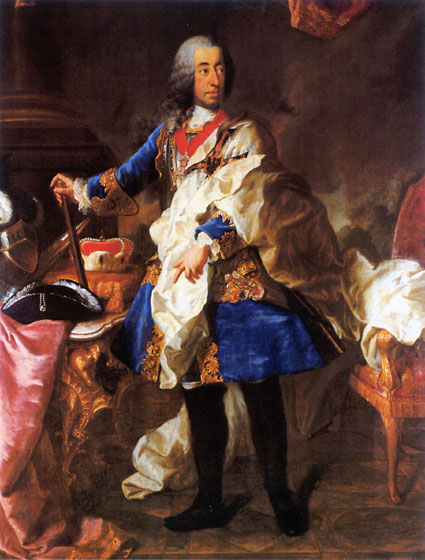
Clemens August of Bavaria

Clemens August of Bavaria (1700–1761), a member of the Wittelsbach dynasty, ruled as Prince-Elector and Archbishop of Cologne, as well as Prince-Bishop of Münster, Hildesheim, Paderborn, and Osnabrück. A passionate patron of the arts and architecture, he left behind a network of princely palaces, hunting lodges and pleasure pavilions across his territories — notably Schloss Augustusburg and Schloss Falkenlust in Brühl, Schloss Clemenswerth in Sögel, and Schloss Arnsberg. These reflected both his taste for refined courtly architecture and his passion for theatrical hunting and ceremonial display. Schloss Herzogsfreude was among his last great building projects, designed by Johann Heinrich Roth (1729–1788).

=== The Ritual of the Par Force Hunt ===
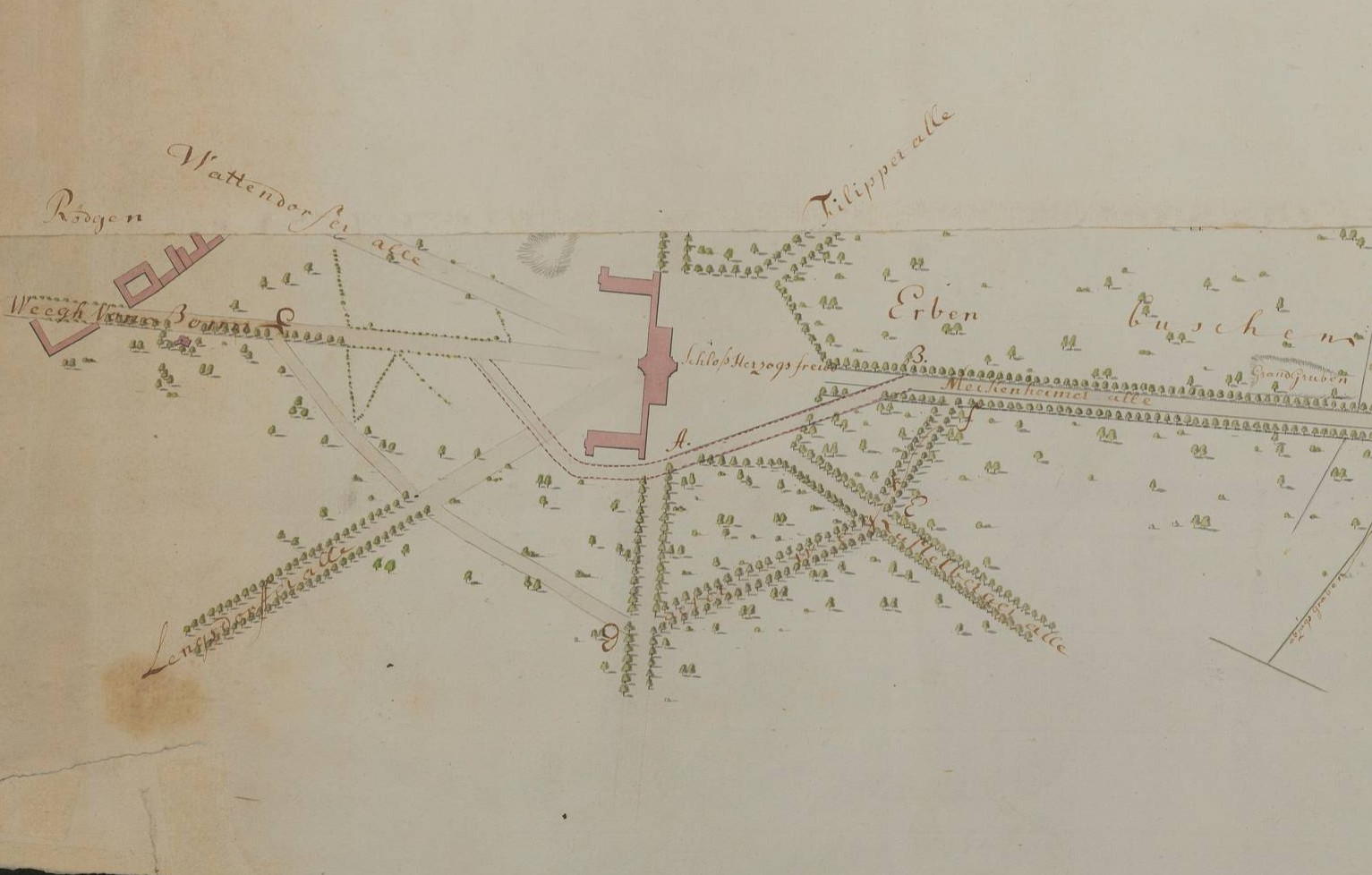
A map showing the radiating forest avenues around Schloss Herzogsfreude (1786)

Clemens August was devoted to the chasse à courre, or par force hunt — a ritualised form of aristocratic hunting imported from the French court of Louis XIV. More than a sport, it was a carefully choreographed theatre of power, discipline, and hierarchy, in which the ruler’s mastery over nature was publicly enacted. Mounted courtiers, accompanied by professional piqueurs and packs of hounds, pursued the stag through a vast, geometrically ordered landscape of radiating forest avenues. The Elector and his distinguished guests often observed from a central clearing, surrounded by attendants, as the horns of the chasse echoed through the Kottenforst.

When the exhausted stag could no longer flee, the hounds brought it to bay, seizing its muzzle, throat, and legs until it was immobilised. At that moment, a distinctive horn signal — the Halali — announced the end of the chase and summoned the Elector to perform the final act. As master of the hunt, he delivered the coup de grâce, a ceremonial dagger thrust to the heart, after which the Ehrenstreich and the distribution of the Bruch (a sprig of oak or laurel placed on the animal’s head) concluded the solemn ritual.

Such hunts demanded purpose-built landscapes, with star-shaped avenues providing visibility, coordination, and movement across long distances — an architectural expression of the same princely order and control that defined the hunt itself.

=== Construction and Design ===
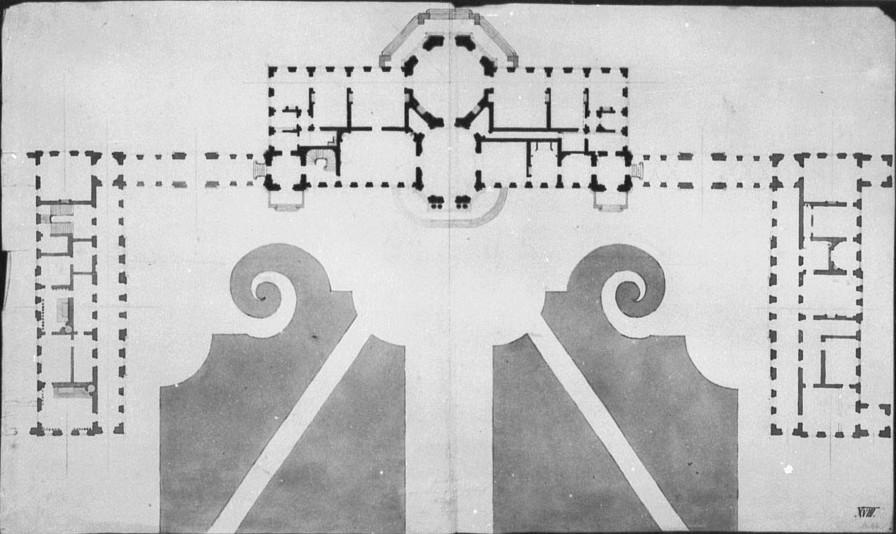
A plan of the main floor of Schloss Herzogsfreude (1754)

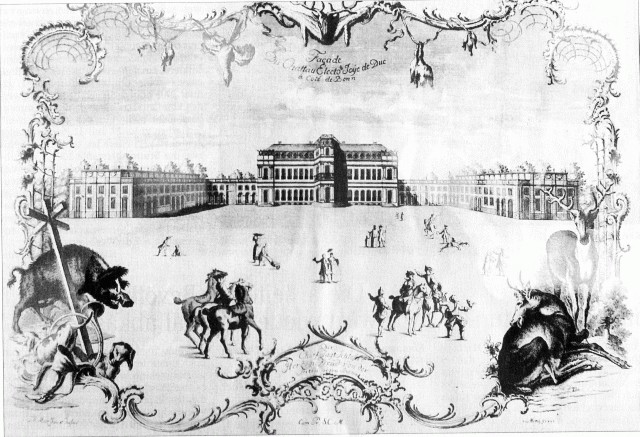
Schloss Herzogsfreude in 1755

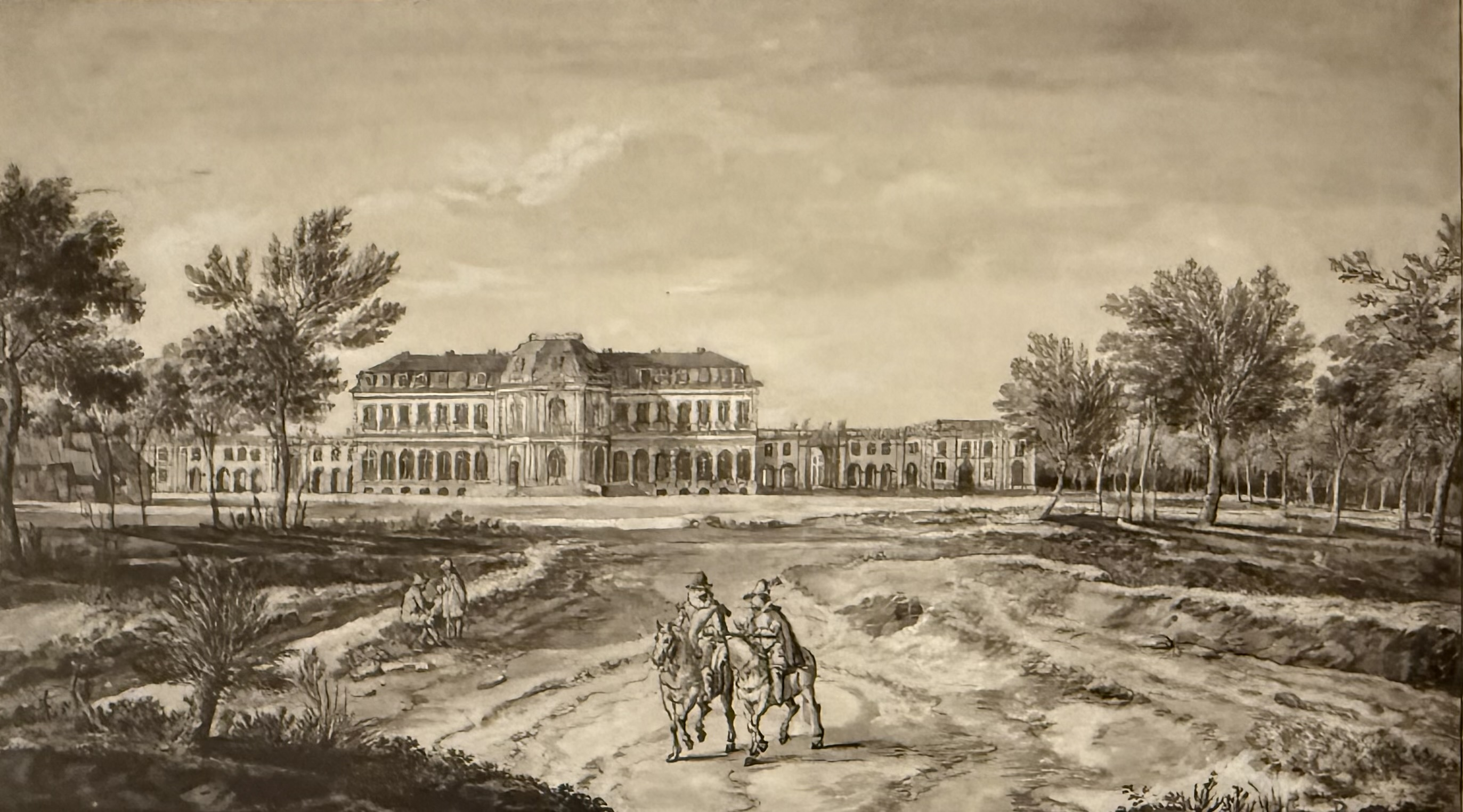
Schloss Herzogsfreude seen from the garden

==== The Kottenforst Landscape ====
The Kottenforst, a dense forest west of Bonn, became one of Clemens August’s principal hunting domains. Beginning in 1727, it was transformed into a chasse royale landscape, with broad, straight avenues cut through the woodland to form star-shaped clearings (German: Sternschneisen). At the centre of one of these clearings, the Elector commissioned a new hunting palace — Schloss Herzogsfreude.

==== Architect and Construction ====
The palace was designed by Johann Heinrich Roth (1729-1788), a court architect active in the Elector’s building campaigns. Construction took place between 1753 and 1761, overlapping with other major projects at Brühl and Bonn. Roth’s design combined the grandeur of a ceremonial residence with the functionality of a hunting lodge.

The main building measured about 70 metres in length, with nineteen window bays. It was flanked by two lower side wings, which embraced a cour d’honneur. The façades were articulated with pilasters and capped by a mansard roof, reflecting the restrained late Baroque idiom of the 1750s. The palace’s layout and symmetry echoed that of petites maisons de plaisance found in the orbit of Versailles and Lunéville, though simplified for its woodland setting.

==== Completion and Use ====
By the time of Clemens August’s death in 1761, the palace was largely complete and partially furnished, though interior decoration may not have been fully finished. His successors showed little enthusiasm for it. Without the Elector’s courtly presence, the elaborate par force hunts ceased, and Herzogsfreude fell silent. Some of the interior fittings were dismantled and repurposed for the completion of Schloss Augustusburg at Brühl.

=== Decline and Demolition ===
==== French Occupation ====
During the French Revolutionary Wars, the entire left bank of the Rhine was occupied by French troops in 1794. The Electorate of Cologne was dissolved, and its last prince-elector, Maximilian Francis of Austria (1756–1801), fled Bonn. With the abolition of ecclesiastical principalities and the decline of aristocratic hunting culture, Herzogsfreude lost all purpose.

==== Auction and Demolition ====
In June 1804, the French administration sold the estate at public auction. The buyer, a Bonn roofer named Peter Lander, acquired it for 3,550 francs. Over the following years, the palace was methodically dismantled. Bricks, stones, wooden floors, copper roofing, and other materials were sold piece by piece. Much of the stonework was transported for reuse in the expansion of the Wesel citadel.

By 1810, the once-splendid hunting lodge had vanished entirely. Only a few cellar vaults and substructures survived underground, later incorporated into private houses.

== Remnants and Commemoration ==
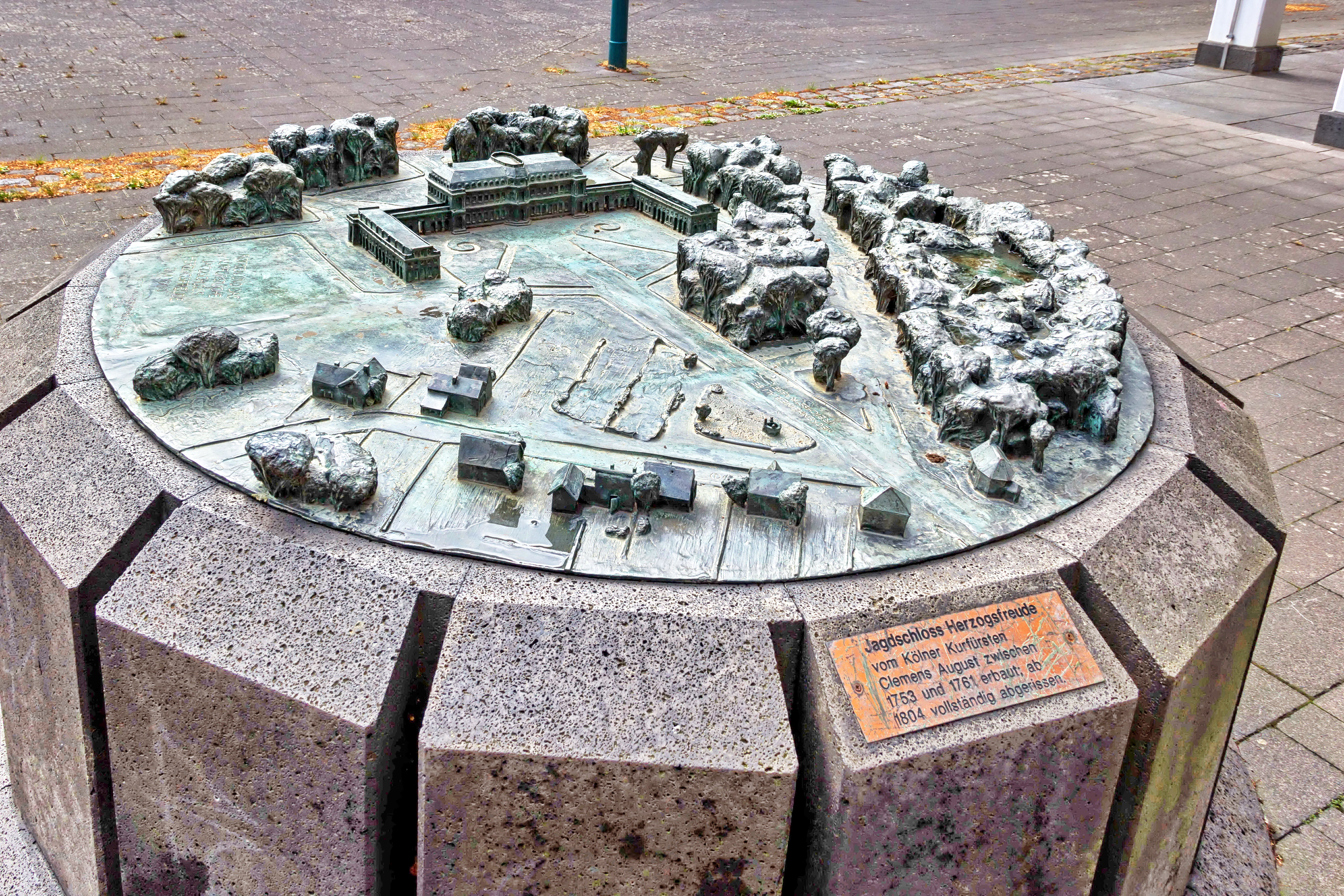
A bronze miniature model of Schloss Herzogsfreude on its former location

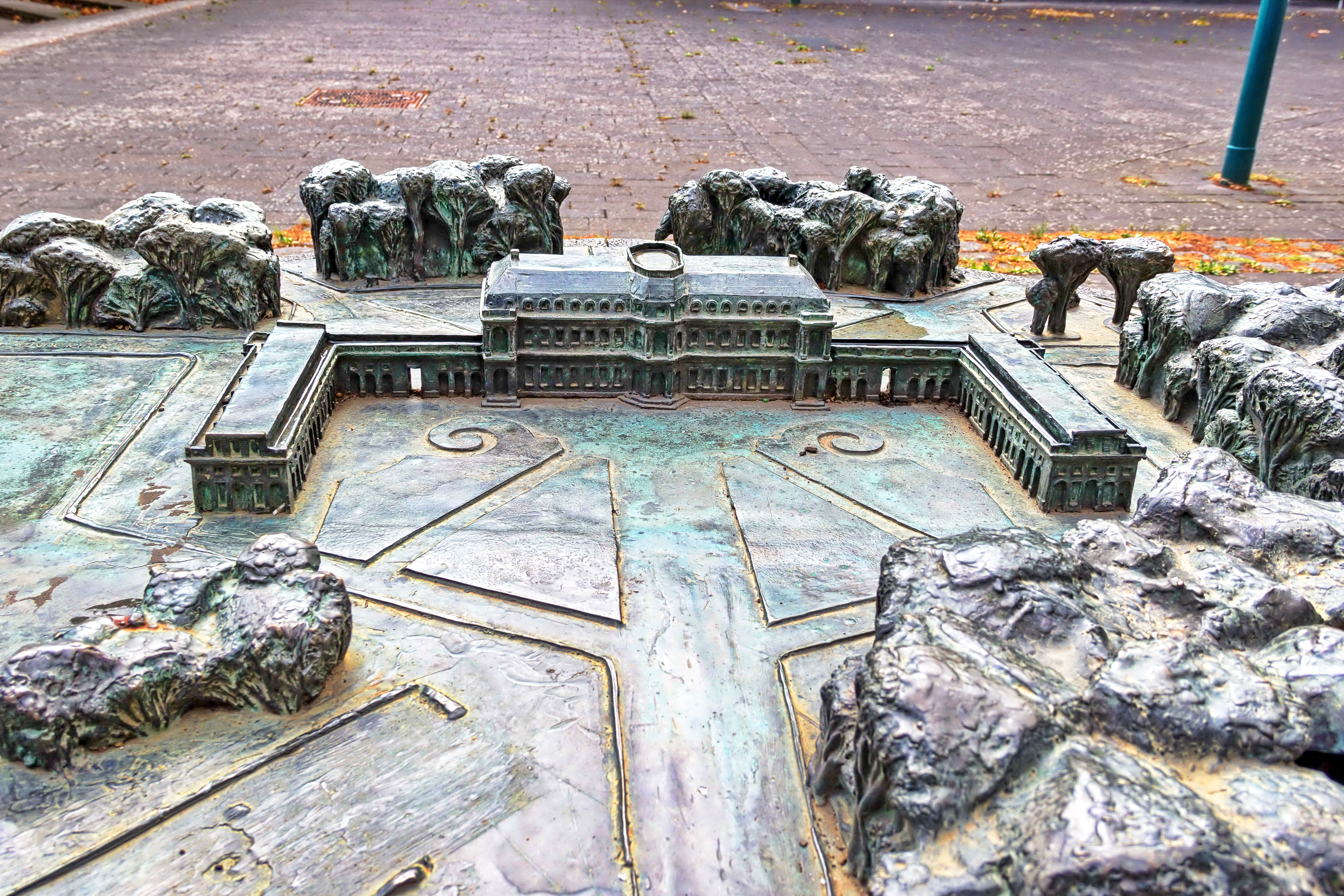
Schloss Herzogsfreude in detail

=== Physical Traces ===
Today, no above-ground remains of Schloss Herzogsfreude exist. Yet the star-shaped pattern of forest avenues in the Kottenforst remains visible, preserving the geometry of Clemens August’s hunting landscape.

A small hunter’s cottage, built at the same time as the palace, still stands and now serves as the forest administration office. The nearby Saint Venantius Chapel, also commissioned by Clemens August, remains one of the few contemporary structures still intact.

Although the palace itself was dismantled, several elements of its interior decoration were salvaged and reused at Schloss Augustusburg in Brühl. There, parts of the original fittings from Herzogsfreude can still be seen — most notably Room 48 (Obergeschoss, Großes Neues Appartement, Schlafzimmer), whose wall panelling and ornamental scheme derive directly from the lost hunting lodge; Room 49, which preserves both its Rococo wall panelling and a portrait of Electress Maria Anna Sophia of Bavaria, originally displayed at Herzogsfreude;; and a small chapel decorated by Carlo Innocenzo Carloni, which likewise incorporates furnishings transferred from the former palace.

=== Modern Memory ===
In Röttgen itself, local street names — Schlossplatz, Kurfürstenplatz, and Herzogsfreudenweg — recall the vanished palace. Fragments of the former cellar vault are believed to survive beneath several private houses. Since 1984, a bronze miniature model on the Schlossplatz commemorates the site and depicts the palace as it once appeared.

== Depictions and Artistic Legacy ==
=== Paintings by François Rousseau ===
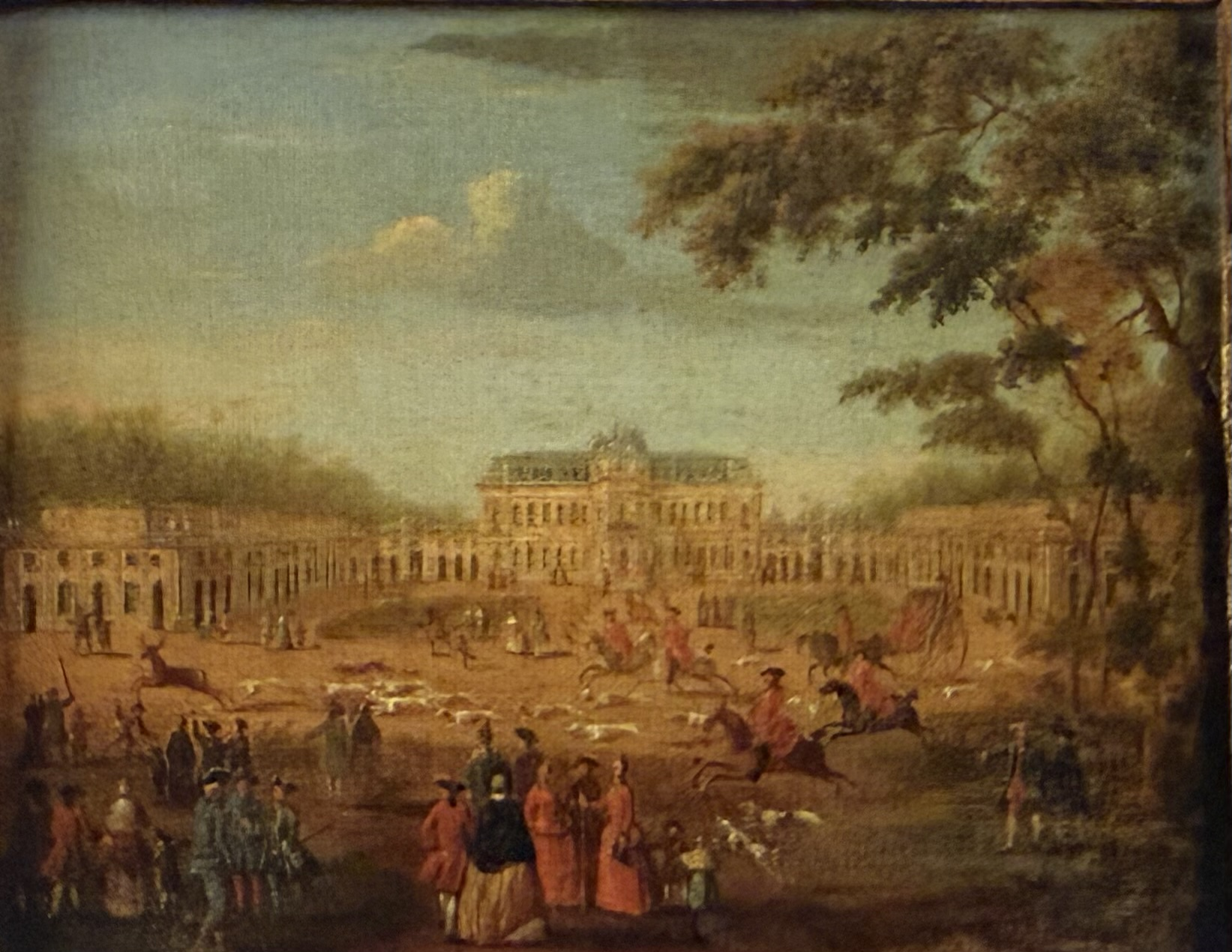
Front view of Schloss Herzogsfreude, painted by François Rousseau

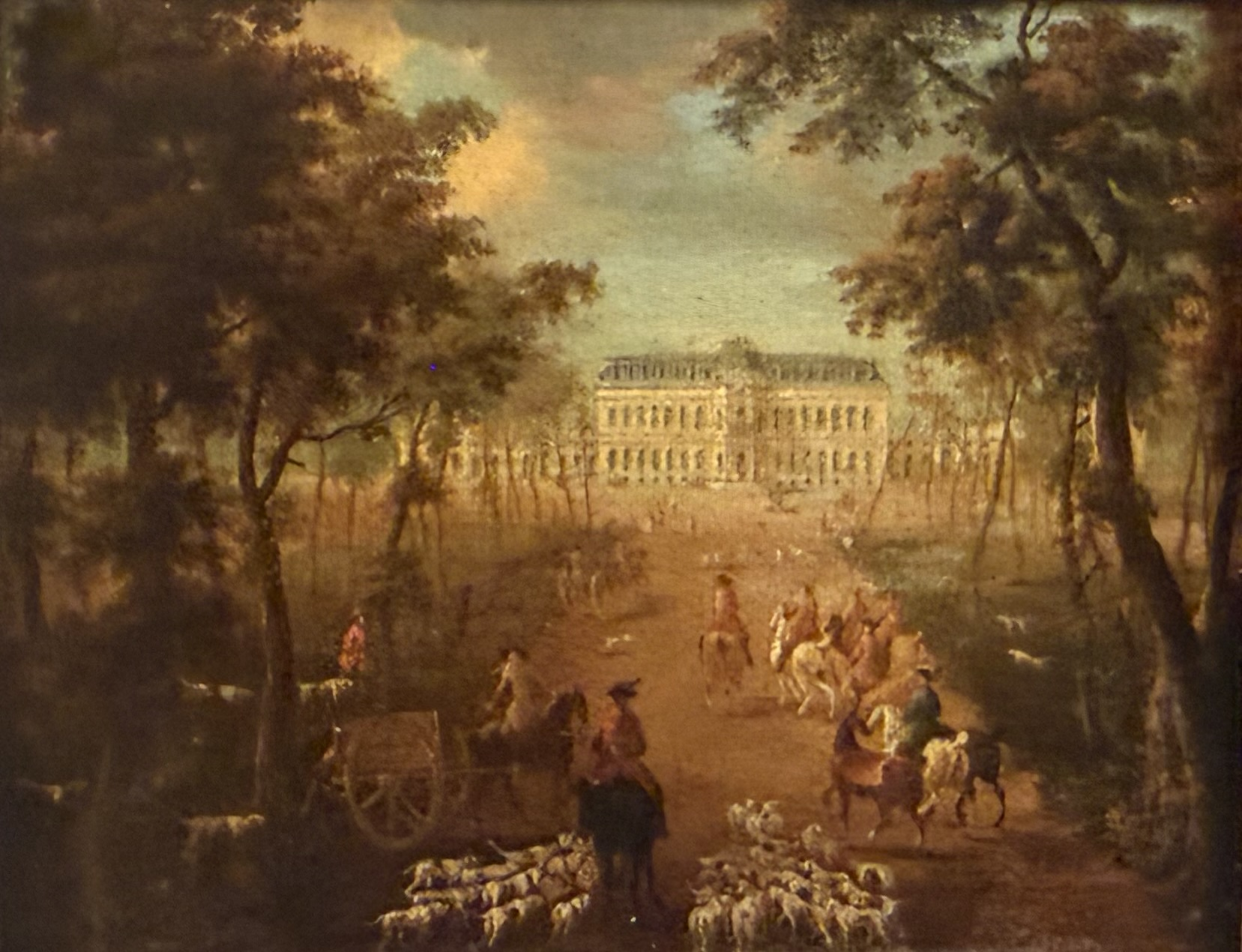
Garden view of Schloss Herzogsfreude, painted by François Rousseau

Two oil paintings of Schloss Herzogsfreude, created in 1759 by François Rousseau, the Elector’s court painter, were rediscovered and auctioned in France in 2005. They had previously appeared in an 1868 sale at the Hôtel Drouot in Paris. The paintings show the palace amid its park landscape, providing rare visual documentation of its appearance before demolition.

=== Architectural and Decorative Representations ===
An overdoor (supraporte) painting depicting Schloss Herzogsfreude around 1765 is preserved in Schloss Gymnich near Bonn.

The LWL Landesmuseum in Münster holds an 18th-century gaming table by Adolphe Jacque (1760), whose trompe-l’œil scagliola tabletop includes a finely rendered miniature of the palace. The table originally belonged to the furnishings of Schloss Münster, built for Clemens August’s successor.

=== Plans, Engravings, and Drawings ===
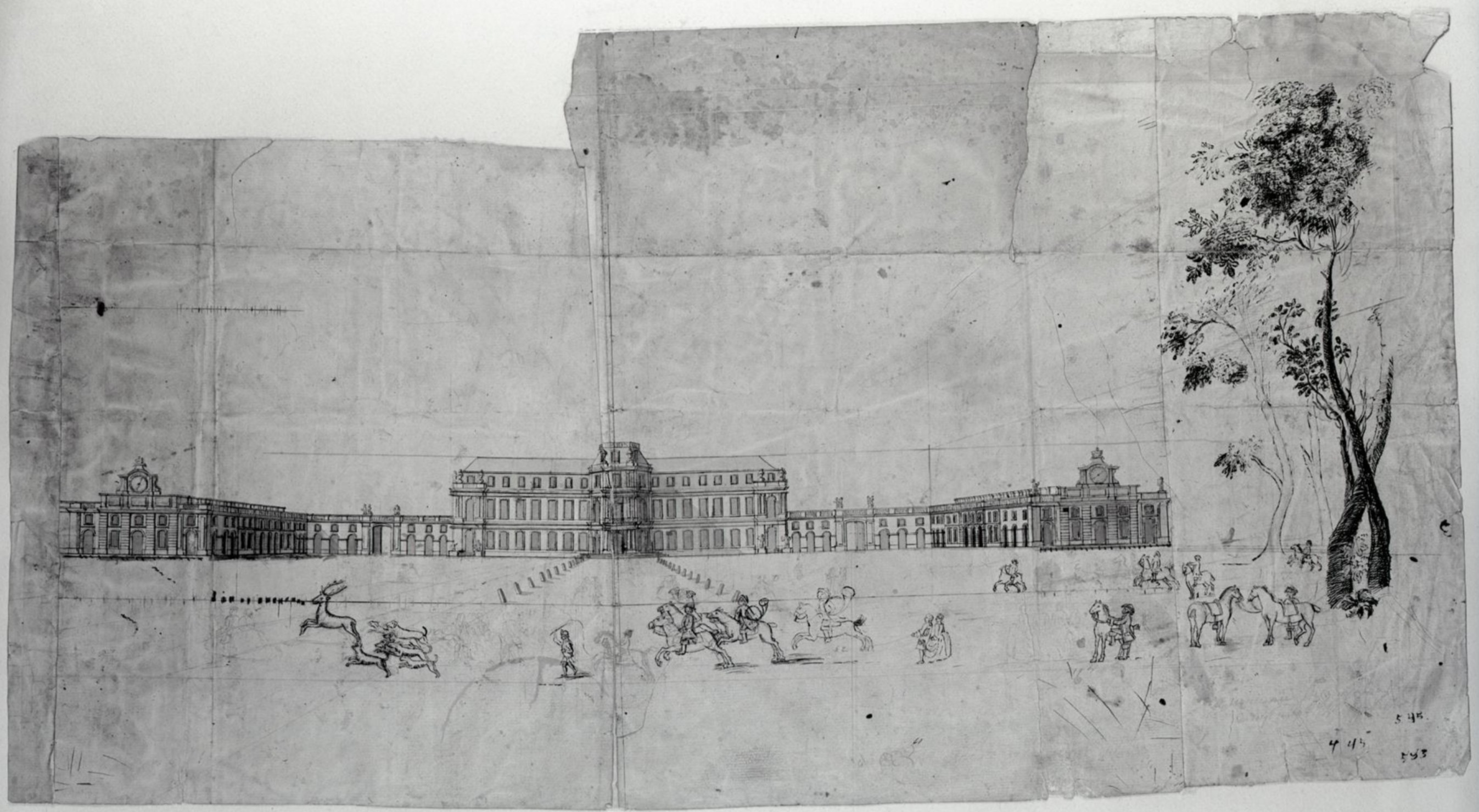
The collections of the Wallraf–Richartz Museum in Cologne contain this drawing of Schloss Herzogsfreude

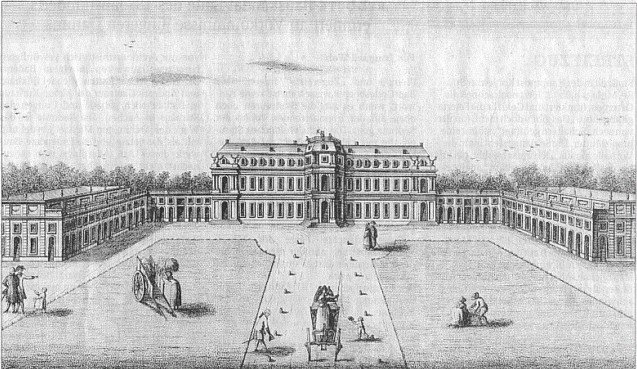
Schloss Herzogsfreude in 1785

Numerous engraved views, architectural plans, and drawings survive in German archives and museums, including a 1754 plan and depictions from 1755 and 1785. These materials document the palace’s refined proportions and its integration within the hunting avenues — valuable records of a vanished Baroque ensemble that once embodied the leisure and splendour of the late Electorate of Cologne.

== See also ==
Other palaces, residences and hunting lodges of Clemens August of Bavaria;

- Schloss Arnsberg
- Augustusburg and Falkenlust Palaces, Brühl
- Clemenswerth Palace
- Electoral Palace, Bonn
- Schloss Hirschberg
- Mergentheim Palace
- Poppelsdorf Palace
