= Poppelsdorf Palace =

Baroque building in Germany

Coordinates: 50°43′30″N 7°05′32″E

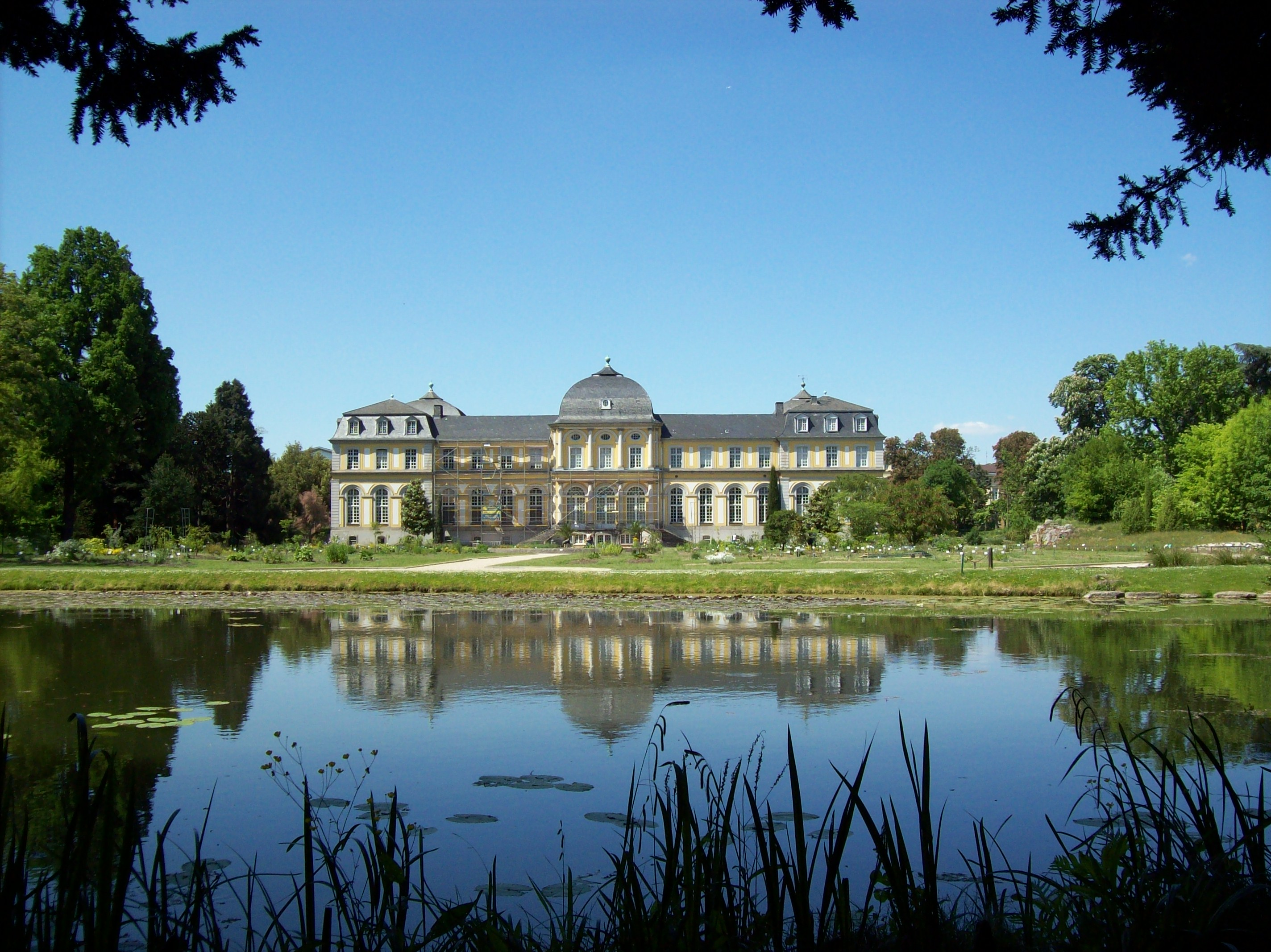
Garden facade of the Poppelsdorf Palace

Poppelsdorf Palace (German: Poppelsdorfer Schloss) is a Baroque building in the Poppelsdorf district of Bonn, western Germany, which is now part of the University of Bonn.

== Design and construction ==
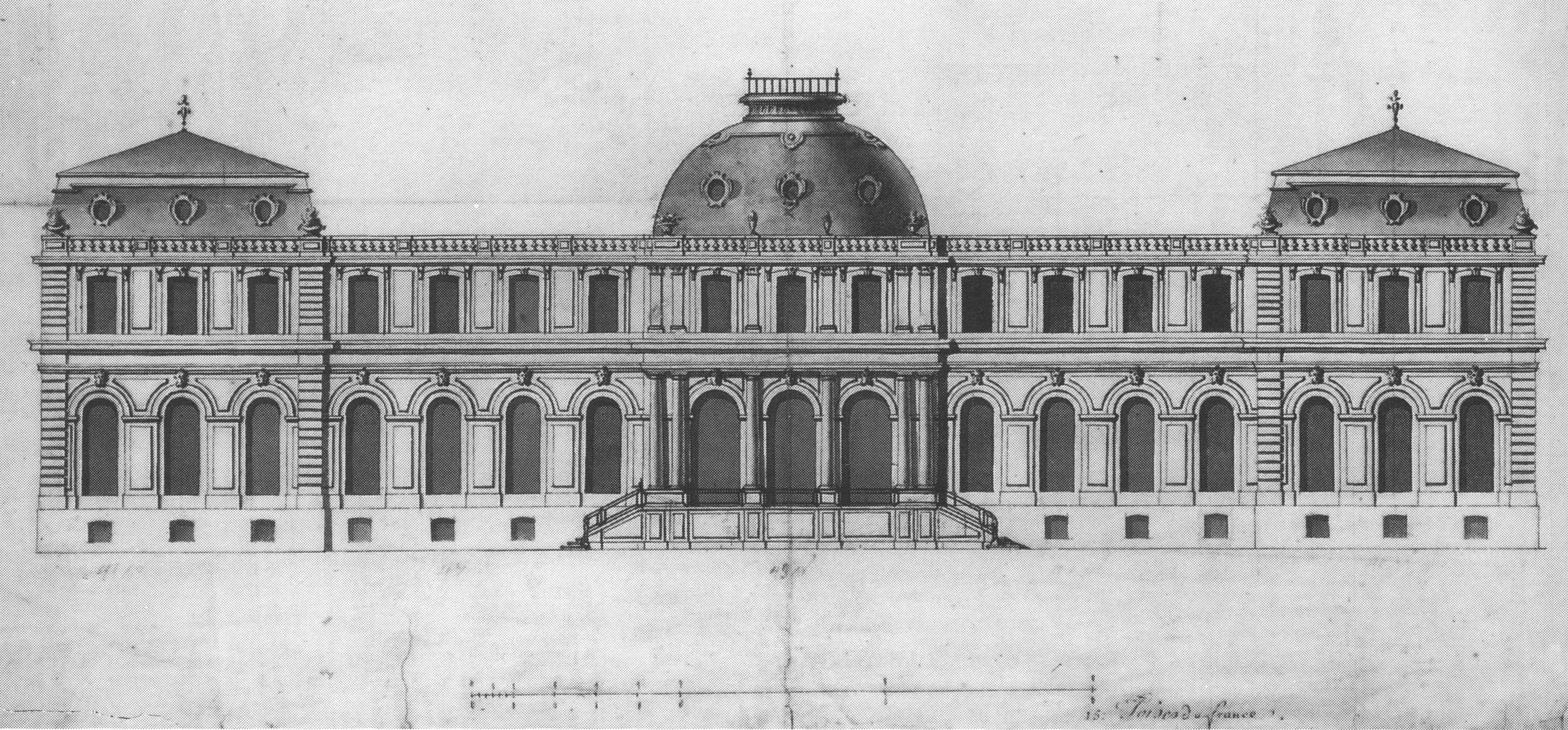
Elevation from de Cotte's first project, May 1715

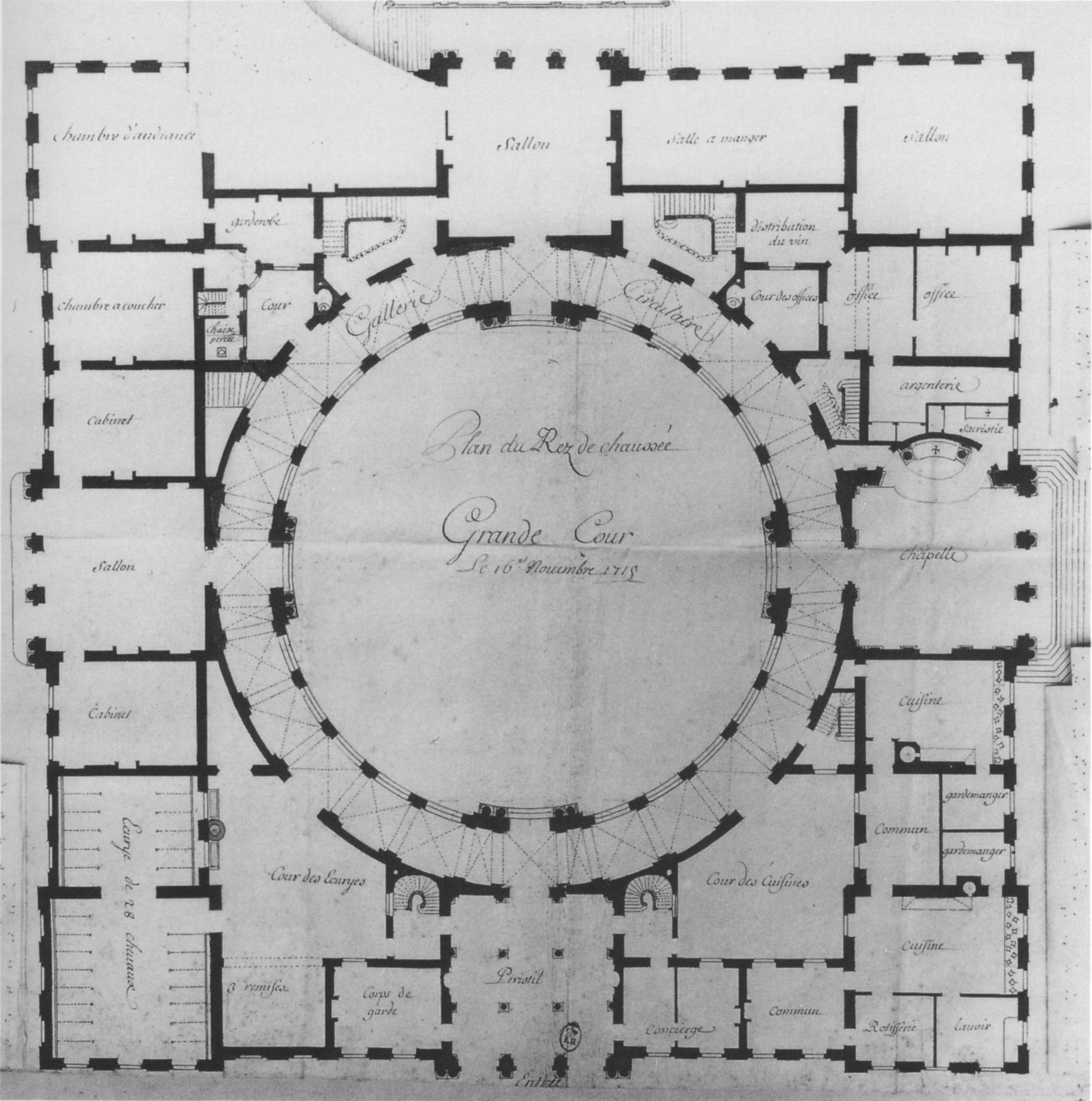
Plan of the ground floor from de Cotte's second project, 16 November 1716

The design of a new structure to replace the old ruined castle of Poppelsdorf commenced in 1715 at the request of the owner, Joseph Clemens, Archbishop-Elector of Cologne, who engaged the French architect Robert de Cotte. Clemens wanted a maison de plaisance that would be near his remodeled Bonn Palace 800 metres (1/2 mile) to the north. There was to be a canal between the two, following the example of the Palace of Versailles and the Trianon de Marbre.

De Cotte himself never travelled to Bonn to inspect the site, and on 24 May 1715 Clemens wrote to him: "I received your project for my Maison de Poppelsdorf, which pleased me infinitely, and I know nothing more beautiful or better conceived, but we are now obliged to consider the site on which it must be built."

No drawing exists of the plan for De Cotte's first project, but letters and subsequent plans indicate that it was square with two axes of symmetry at right angles to one another. It consisted of four two-storey wings surrounding a circular inner court with an arcaded gallery on its circumference. Clemens considered the plan too ambitious and asked de Cotte's assistant in Bonn, Benoît de Fortier, to revise the plan, reducing three of the wings to one storey, but leaving the garden wing with two. Clemens wrote to de Cotte: "I realized that it would be quite useless to erect so large a building on that site, which is but a cannon shot from town ... For the most part my retinue returns to the city at night, and I keep near me only those who are absolutely necessary to serve me."

The extant plan shows a square entrance vestibule with 16 columns: four free-standing, and the remainder engaged with the walls. The vestibule leads to the circular gallery, on the opposite side of which is a doorway leading into the main domed salon on the garden front. To the left of the salon is the elector's apartment arranged as an enfilade of grande salle, chambre d'audience, chambre à coucher (bedroom), and a cabinet. To the right of the salon is the salle à manger (dining room). The chapel is located in the center of the right wing, while the right front quadrant houses the kitchens and the concierge, and the left front quadrant, the stables. Minor rooms, stairs, and a loo occupy the corners between circular gallery and the main rooms in the garden side, and the corresponding spaces on the entrance side provide courtyards for the kitchens and the stables.

Models for this type of plan of a country house with an interior circular courtyard include the Villa Madama, Rome (begun c. 1516), and the Villa Farnese, Caprarola (begun 1559). Work came to a halt after Clemens' death in 1723, but his nephew and heir, Archbishop of Cologne Clemens August, undertook a second campaign of construction in 1745–1746.

== Subsequent history ==
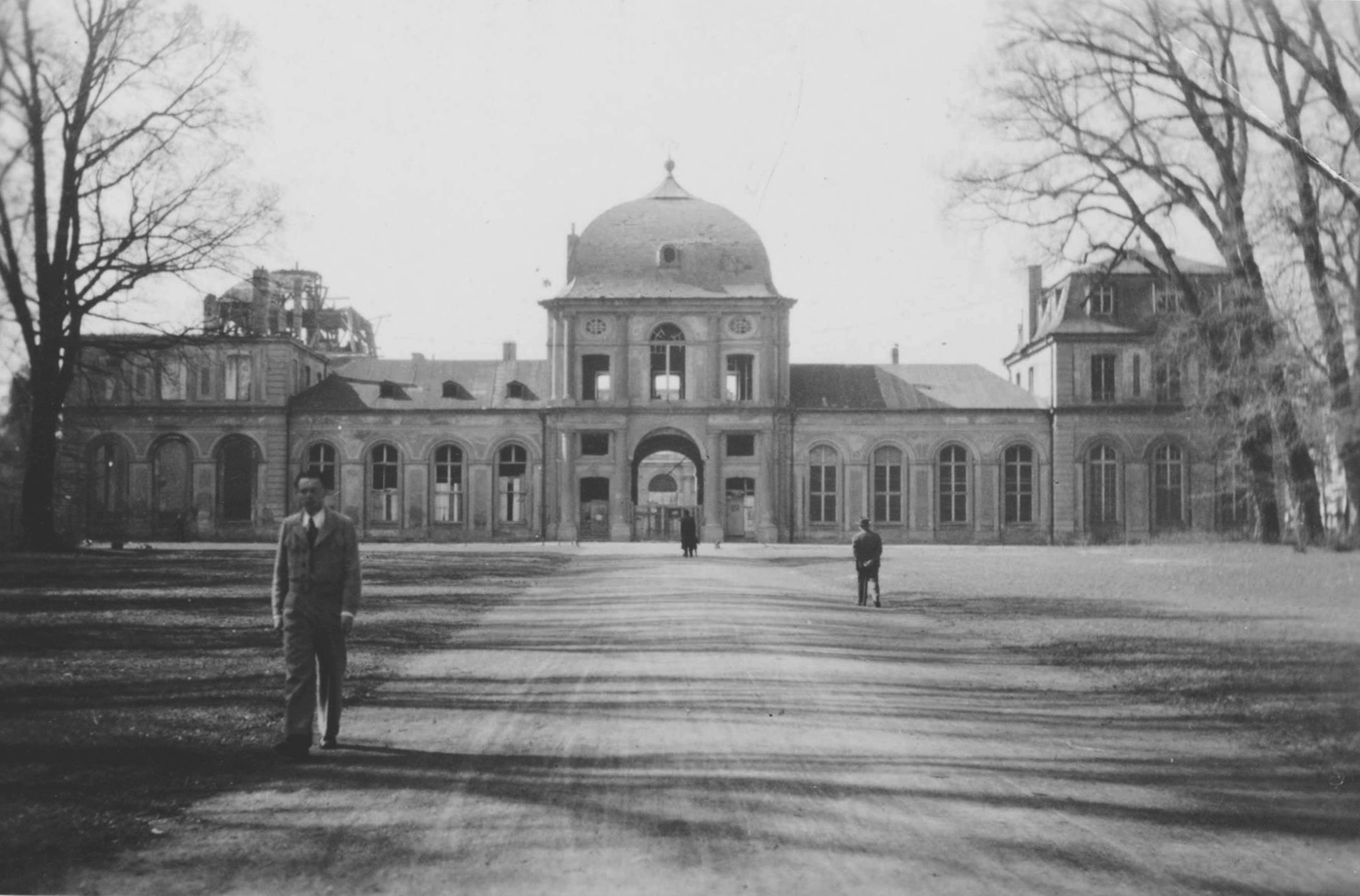
In 1946, showing war damage

In 1818, under Prussian rule, the palace and the nearby park became part of the University of Bonn. The same year the park was converted to the Botanical Garden of Bonn, which today contains about 0.5 hectares of greenhouse area with eleven greenhouses and about 8,000 different plants.

In 1944 the palace was heavily damaged by an Allied air attack. It has been rebuilt in a much simpler appearance from 1955.

== See also ==
- List of Baroque residences

== See also ==
- Schloss Ahaus
- Schloss Arnsberg
- Augustusburg and Falkenlust Palaces, Brühl
- Clemenswerth Palace
- Electoral Palace, Bonn
- Schloss Herzogsfreude
- Schloss Hirschberg near Arnsberg
- Schloss Liebenburg
- Mergentheim Palace
- Schloss Neuhaus in Paderborn
- Osnabrück Palace
- Schloss Sassenberg
- Vinea Domini in Bonn
- Amtshaus Wiedenbrück (also known as Burg Reckenberg)
