= Augustusburg and Falkenlust Palaces, Brühl =

Historical building complex in Brühl, Germany

Castles of Augustusburg and Falkenlust at Brühl
UNESCO World Heritage Site
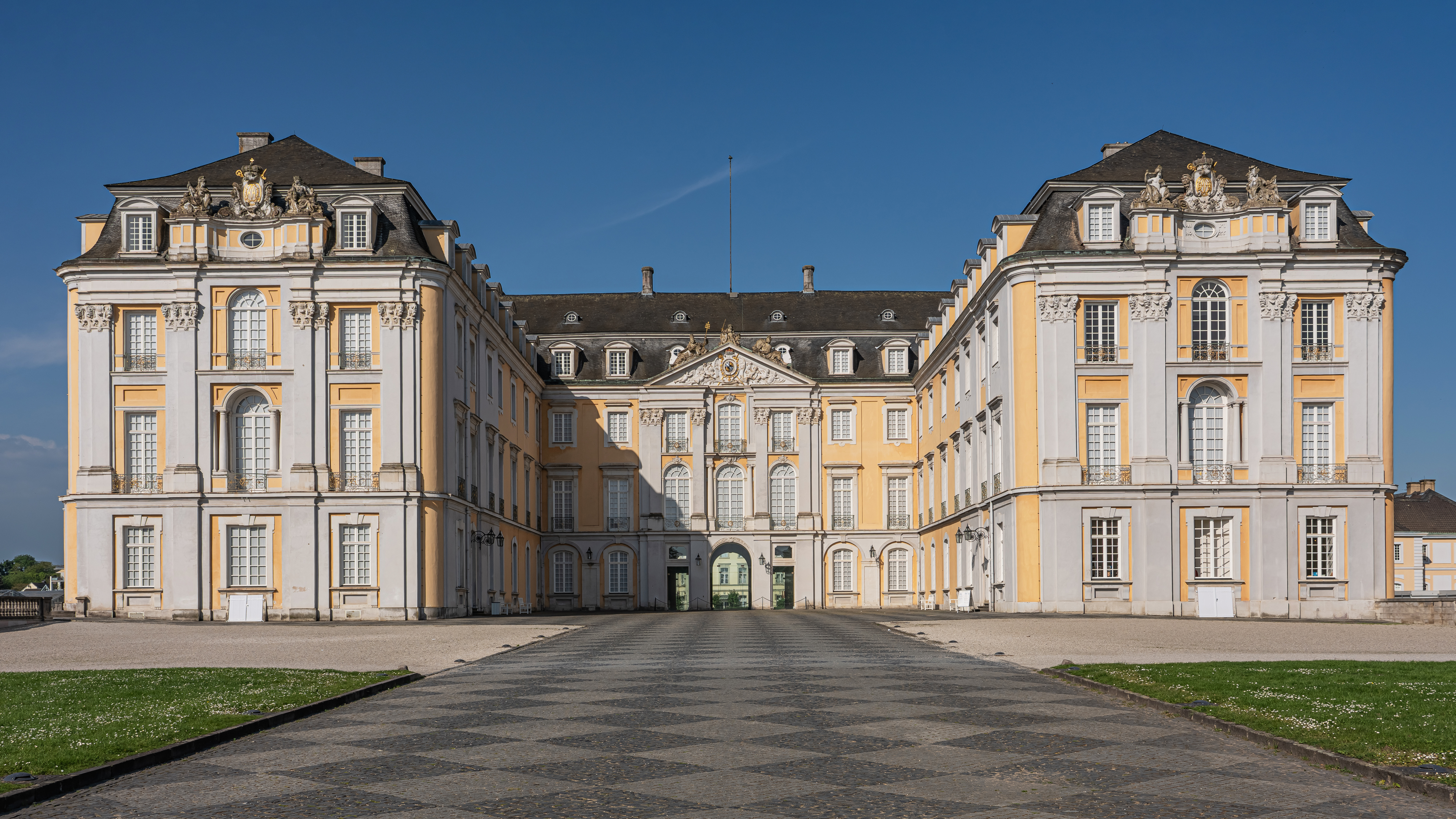
- Schloss Augustusburg

- Location within Germany Location within North Rhine-Westphalia
- Location: Brühl, North Rhine-Westphalia, Germany
- Criteria: Cultural: (ii), (iv)
- Reference: 288
- Inscription: 1984 (8th Session)
- Area: 89 ha (0.34 sq mi)
- Coordinates: 50°49′39″N 6°54′29″E

The Augustusburg and Falkenlust Palaces form a historical building complex in Brühl, North Rhine-Westphalia, Germany. The buildings are connected by the spacious gardens and trees of the Schlosspark. Built in the early 18th century, the palaces and adjoining gardens are considered masterpieces of early rococo architecture and have been listed as a UNESCO cultural World Heritage Site since 1984. Augustusburg Palace (German: Schloss Augustusburg) and its parks also serve as a venue for the Brühl Palace Concerts.

== History ==
The Augustusburg Castle was built on the foundations of a medieval castle in 1725. It was planned and funded by Archbishop-Elector of Cologne, Clemens August of Bavaria of the Wittelsbach family, and designed by the architects Johann Conrad Schlaun and François de Cuvilliés. Shortly thereafter, François de Cuvilliés designed the Falkenlust hunting lodge to the southeast for Clemens August to practice falconry, and the lodge was built from 1729 to 1740.

The elaborate gardens surrounding the Augustusburg palace were designed by Dominique Girard. An elaborate parterre for an area south of the palaces was also designed, but it was restructured by Peter Joseph Lenné in the 19th century and turned into a landscape garden. Attempts to renovate the area have proven difficult, due to poor source material availability.

From shortly after World War II until 1994, Augustusburg was used as a reception hall for guests of state by the German President, as it is not far from Bonn, which was the capital of the Federal Republic of Germany at that time.

== Description ==
The palace complex consists of the Augustusburg Palace and the smaller Falkenlust lodge roughly 1 mile to the southeast. The main block of Augustusburg Palace is a U-shaped building with three main storeys and two levels of attics. The three wings are made of brick with a roughcast plaster. Two orangeries adjoin the main building on the north and south sides. The magnificent main staircase was designed by Johann Balthasar Neumann and made of ornate marble, jasper and stucco. The main garden directly south of the Augustusburg Palace is a complex, embroidery-like parterre, with four fountains and a mirror pool, flanked by alleys lined with lime trees. A path runs diagonally south from this garden to the Falkenlust lodge.

The Falkenlust lodge was built in the style of a country home, drawing inspiration from the Amalienburg hunting lodge in the park of Nymphenburg Palace. The main building has two floors, flanked by two single-story buildings that housed the prince-elector's falcons. On the ground floor is an oval salon.

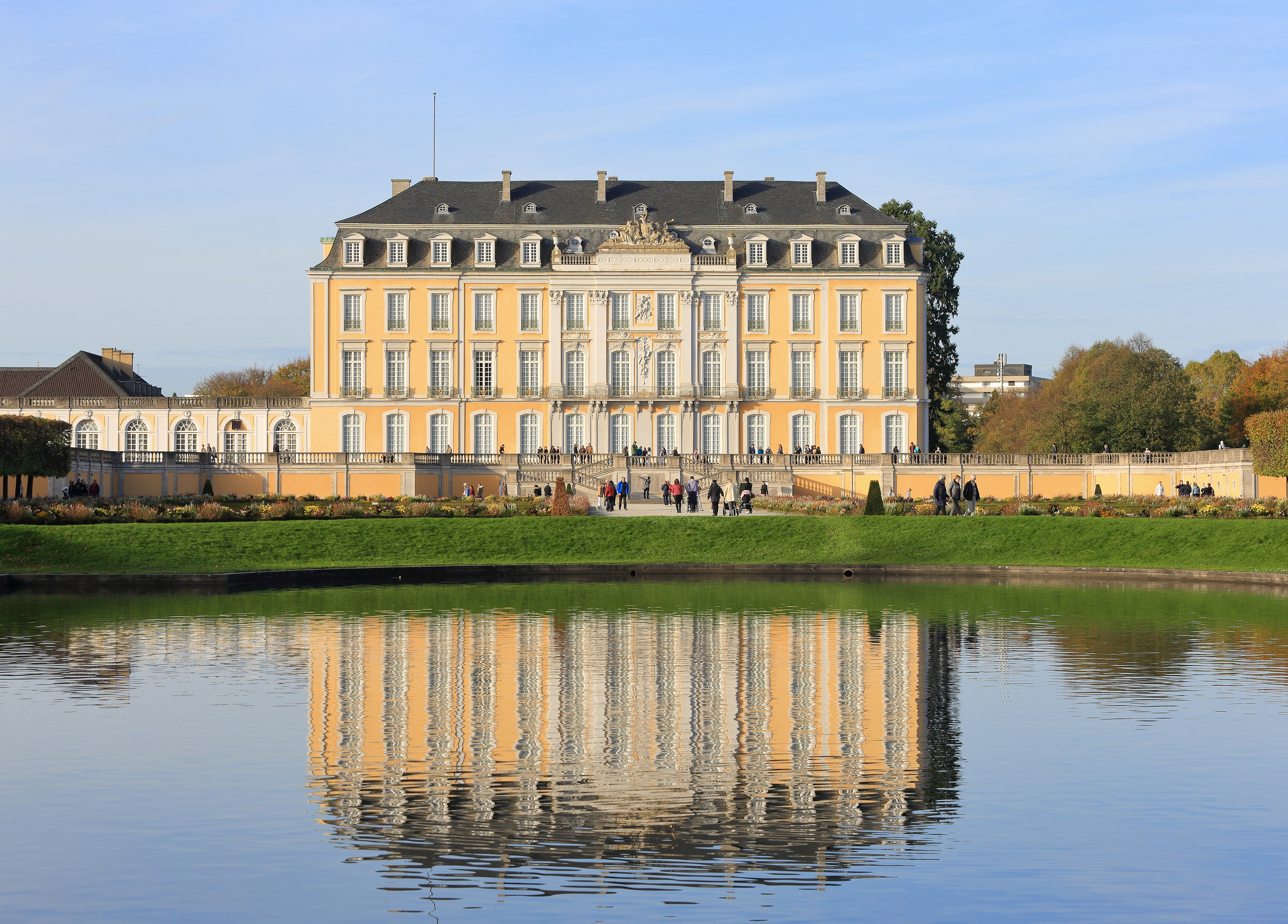
Schloss Augustusburg reflected in the park's basin

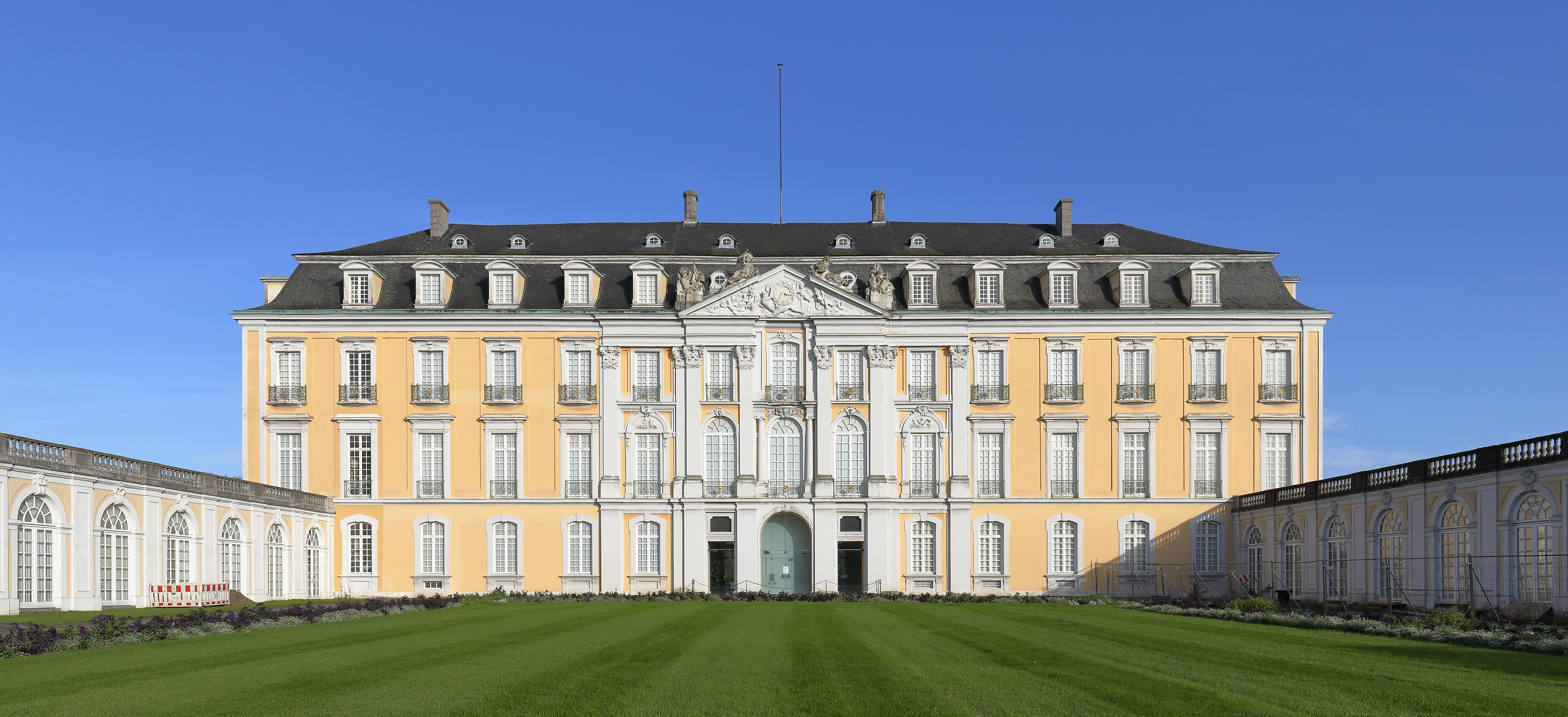
The Western Facade of Schloss Augustusburg

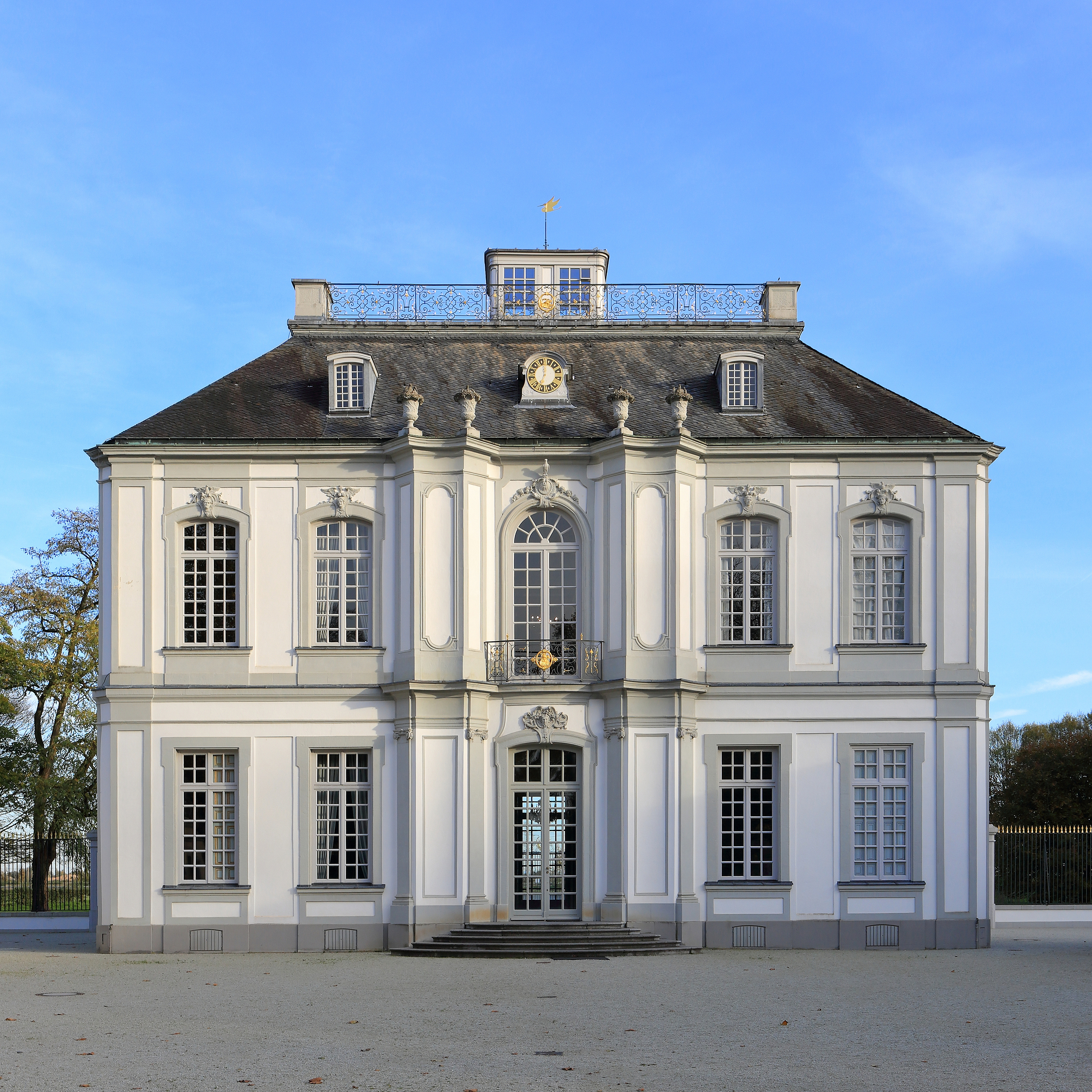
Falkenlust hunting lodge

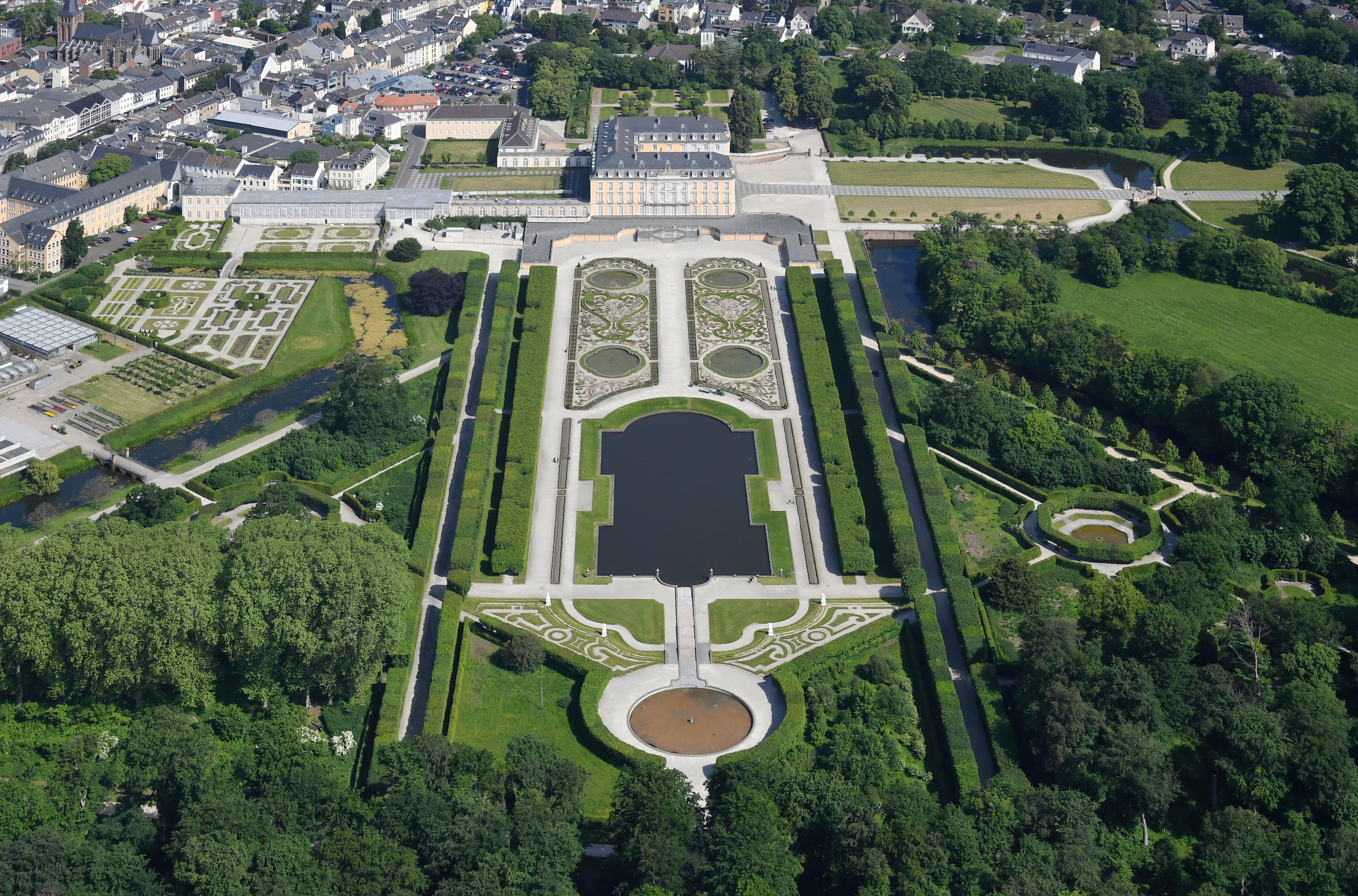
Aerial view of the palace gardens

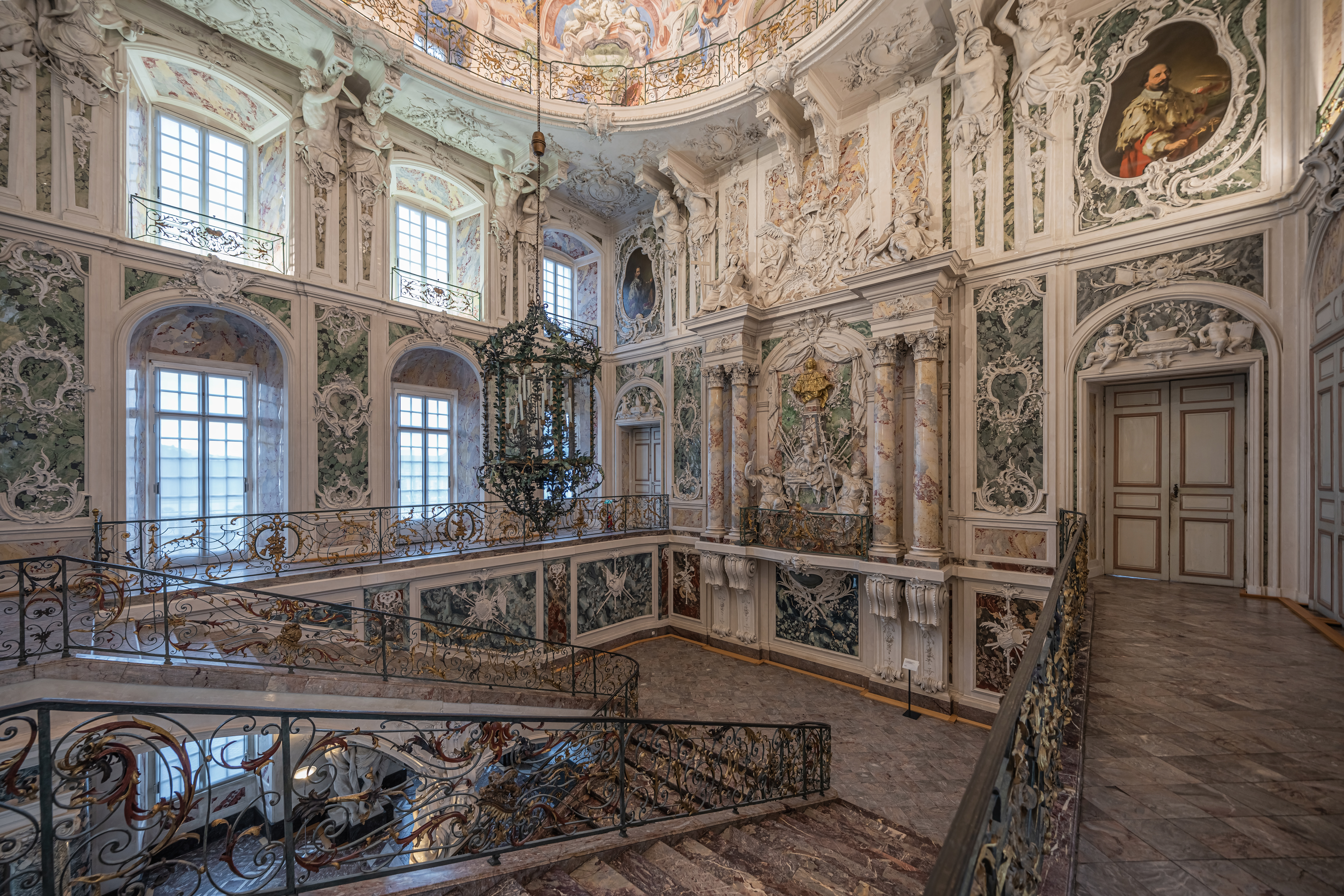
Interior of Augustusburg Palace

Dining and Music Hall of Schloss Augustusburg

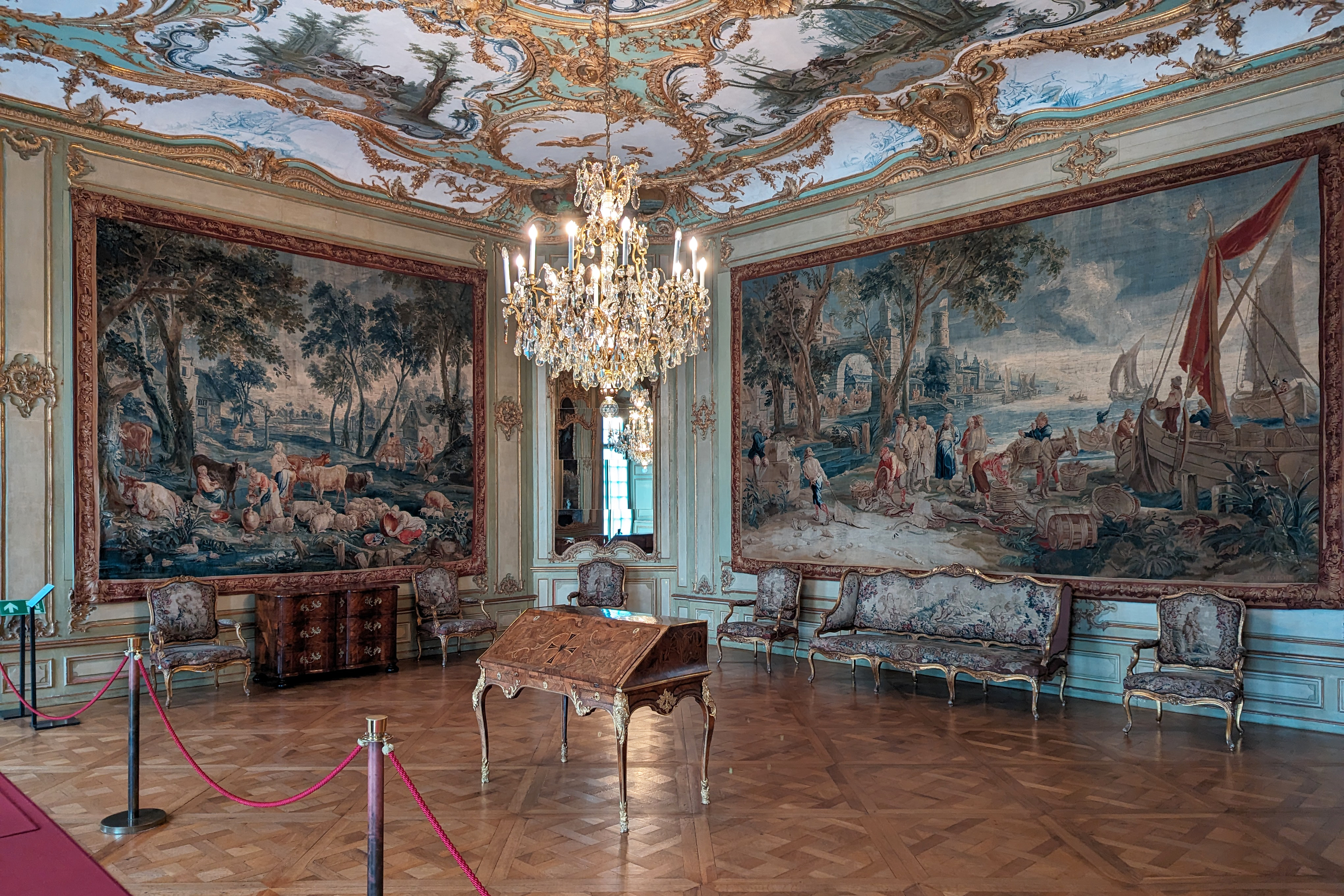
Interior of Schloss Augustusburg

Interior of Schloss Augustusburg

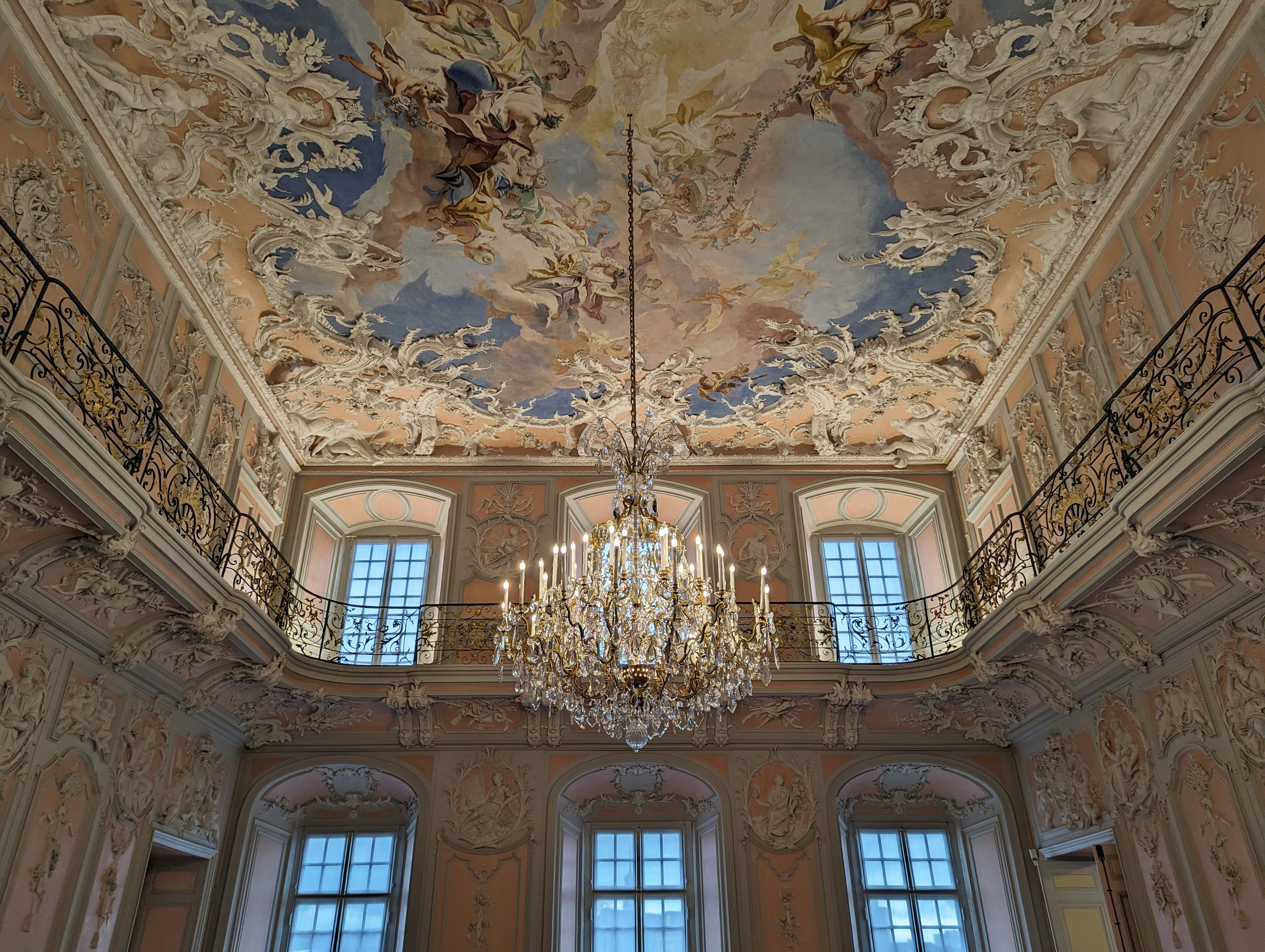
Painted ceiling in Schloss Augustusburg

== See also ==
- List of Baroque residences

== See also: Other palaces, residences and hunting lodges of Clemens August of Bavaria ==
- Schloss Ahaus
- Schloss Arnsberg
- Clemenswerth Palace
- Electoral Palace, Bonn
- Schloss Herzogsfreude
- Schloss Hirschberg near Arnsberg
- Schloss Liebenburg
- Mergentheim Palace
- Schloss Neuhaus in Paderborn
- Osnabrück Palace
- Poppelsdorf Palace in Bonn
- Schloss Sassenberg
- Vinea Domini in Bonn
- Amtshaus Wiedenbrück (also known as Burg Reckenberg)
