= Electoral Palace, Bonn =

German castle

Coordinates: 50.7337°N 7.1027°E

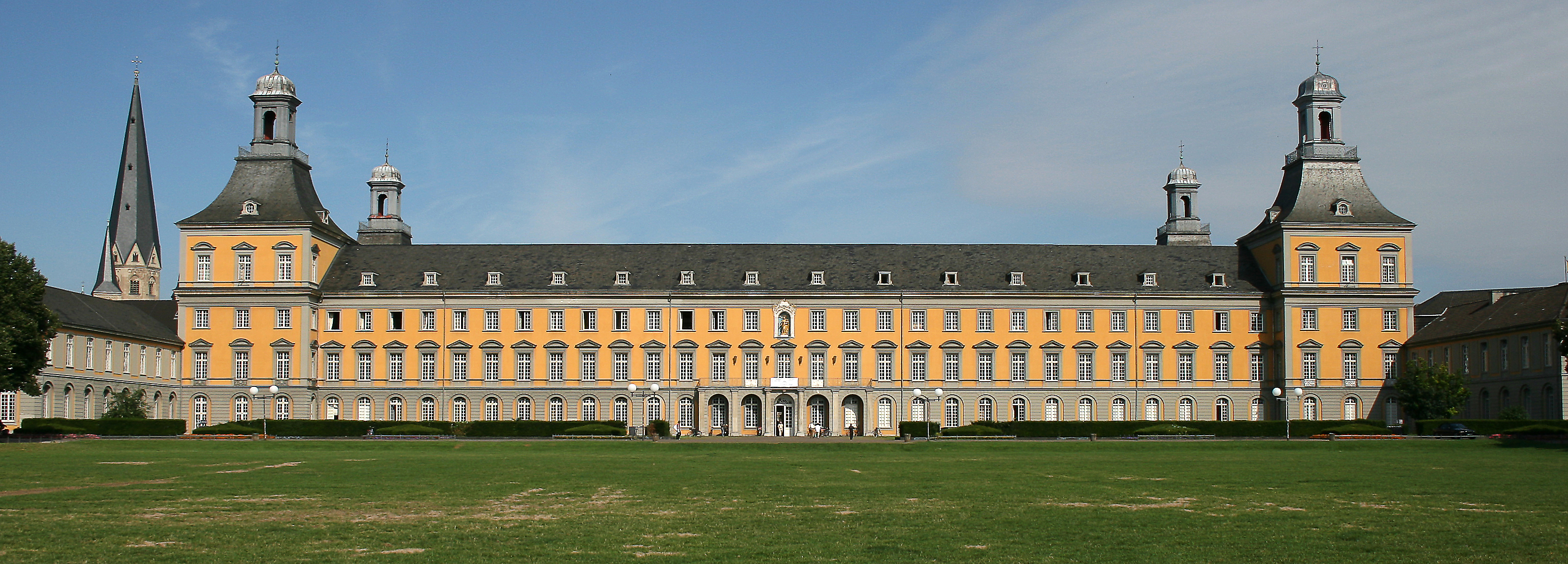
View of the main block of the palace from the Hofgarten, Bonn Minster can be seen in the background

The Electoral Palace (German: Kurfürstliches Schloss) in Bonn is the former residential palace of the Prince-Electors of Cologne. Since 1818, it has been the University of Bonn's main building in the city center, home to the University administration and the faculty of humanities and theology.

It was built by Enrico Zuccalli for the prince-elector Joseph Clemens of Bavaria from 1697 to 1705. The Hofgarten, a large park in front of the main building, is a popular place for students to meet, study and relax. The Hofgarten was repeatedly a place for political demonstrations, as for example the demonstration against the NATO Double-Track Decision on 22 October 1981, with about 250,000 participants.

== History ==
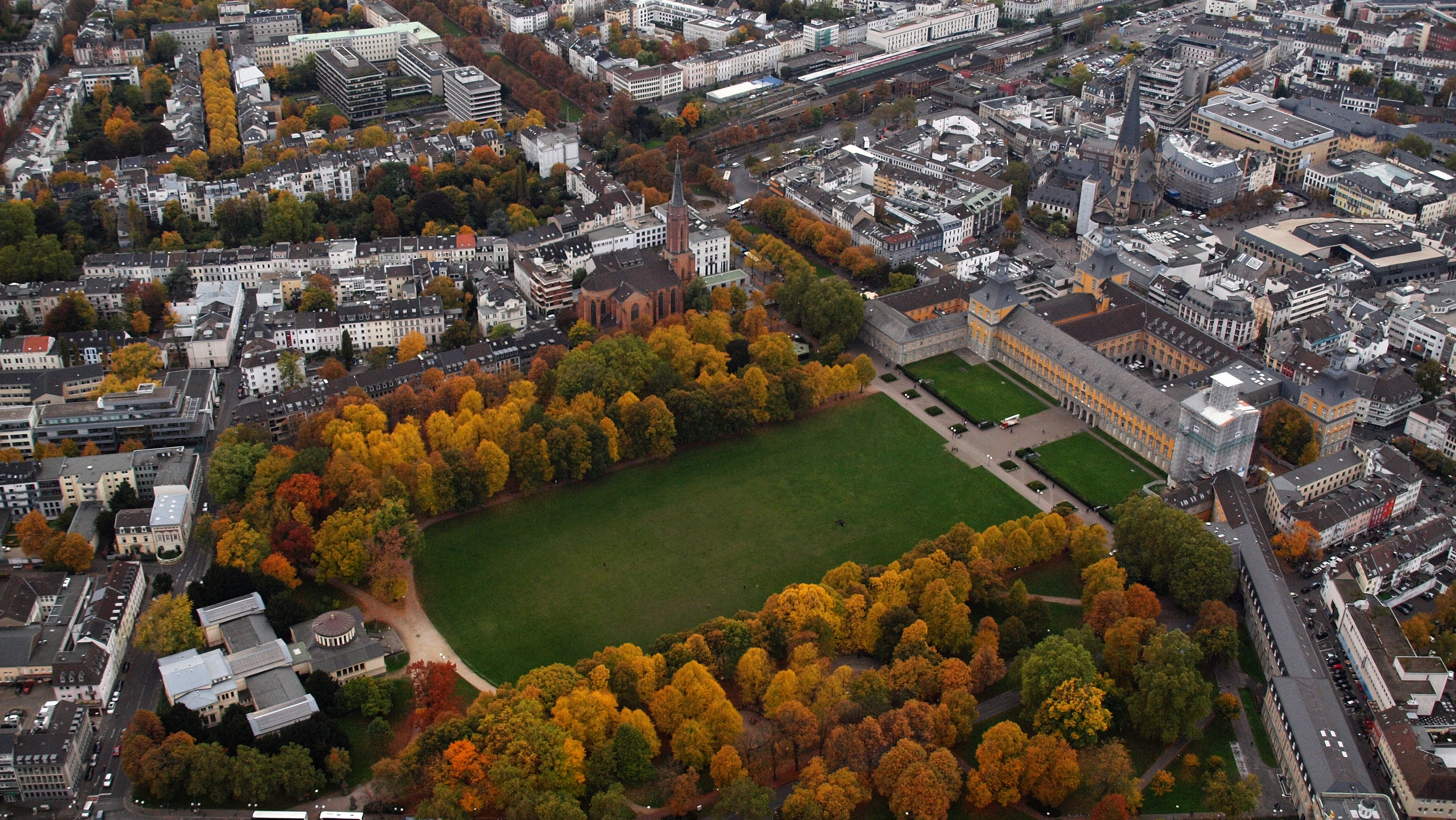
Aerial view of the palace. The Gallery Wing extends to the bottom left.

The predecessor to the current palace was built from 1567 to 1577 for Archbishop-Elector Salentin of Isenburg. The structure was bounded to its south by the city wall of Bonn. It was destroyed during the Siege of Bonn, when Archbishop Joseph Clemens of Bavaria reconquered the city.

Joseph Clemens gave Enrico Zuccalli, his Swiss-born court architect, orders to rebuild the palace (in a grander fashion) from 1697 to 1705. Zuccalli built a quadrangular building with avant-corps on the corners. It encloses an arcaded courtyard, and opens at its northeastern end to a cour d'honneur which originally constituted the main entrance to the palace. A court church was built in the west wing in 1700, which now houses the ceremonial Aula of the university.

Robert de Cotte added a wing to the south of the palace, Buen Retiro, from 1715 to 1723 and laid out extensive palace gardens. The gilded Marian image Regina Pacis, which still stands over the garden-side entrance to the building as the university's patroness, was installed at the center of the palace's third story in 1744.

In 1777, a catastrophic fire started in the west wing of the palace and spread through the roof, eventually reaching the powder chamber and causing a massive explosion. The palace was gutted by the flames, and the explosion killed scores of residents of Bonn; at one point, the fire threatened to burn the entire city. Rebuilding efforts were slow. The Buen Retiro wing was rebuilt in a truncated form, and the court church was also rebuilt on a smaller scale in the east wing. The arrival of revolutionary French troops in 1794 ended the use of the palace as residence of the Archbishop-Electors. After the departure of the French, its ownership transferred to the Prussian crown. Frederick William III donated the building to the new Rhenish Friedrich Wilhelm University of Bonn in 1818.

In the 1920s, the Buen Retiro wing which was badly damaged in the 1777 explosion was fully rebuilt according to de Cotte's plans, and the fourth avant-corps tower was finally rebuilt. The building was again destroyed by allied bombing in 1944 and was rebuilt until 1951. The exterior was fully restored to its previous state, but, with the exception of a handful of rooms, including the church, the interior was rebuilt in a stripped-down manner more conducive to university use.

== Architecture ==
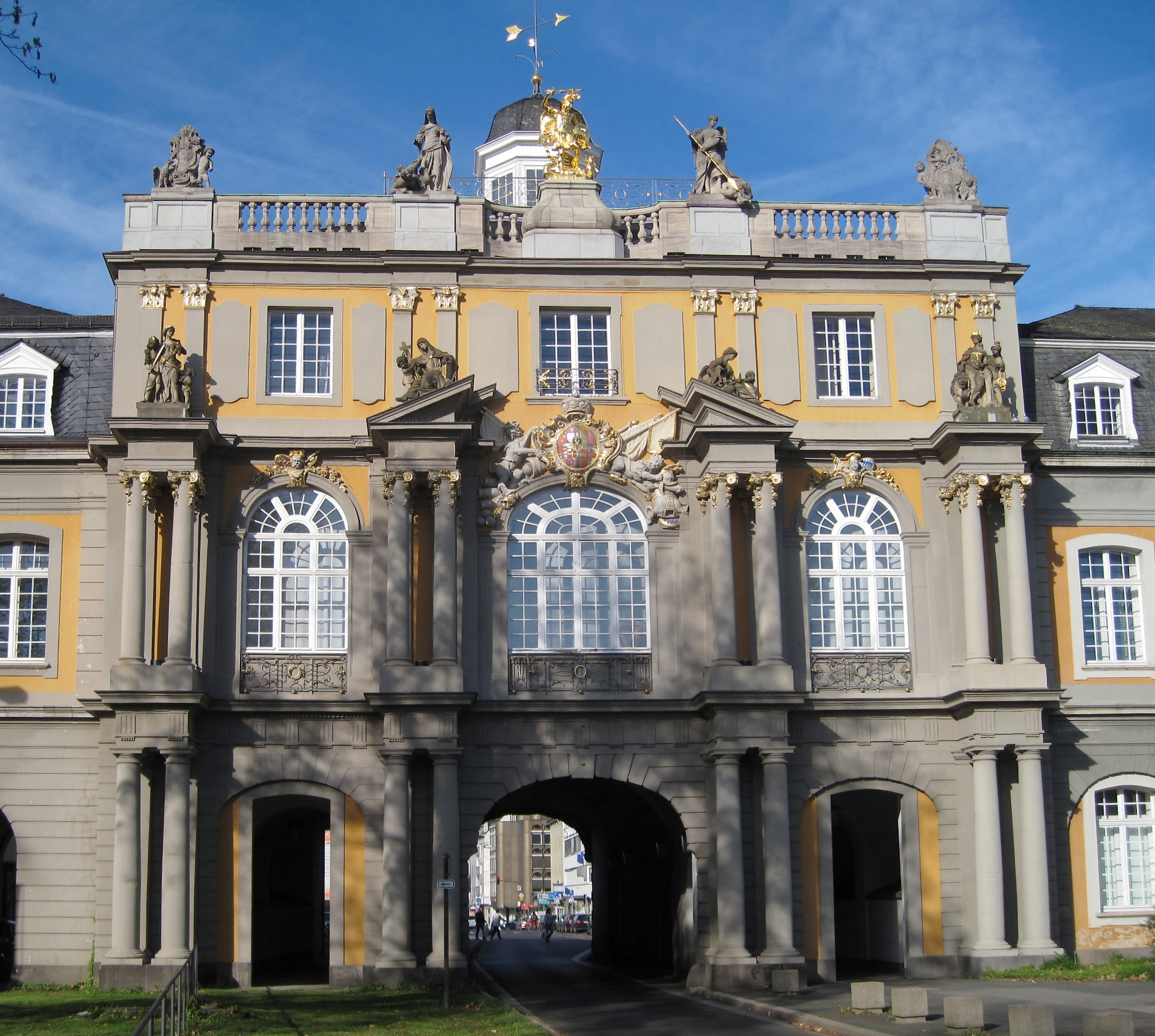
The Koblenz Gate

The main building of the palace is three stories in height and rectangular. Its first story is rusticated, while the second, main story's windows feature alternating segmental and triangular pediments. The parallel long ends are framed by four-story towers which have lanterns on their roofs. Its strict, relatively unadorned style strongly recalls the Escorial and Herrerian style more generally. The short western side forms one end of the Poppelsdorfer Allee, facing Poppelsdorf Palace. The central courtyard is lined with arcades and open on either end, serving as a connection between Bonn's downtown and the Hofgarten park. The church, the northeastern end of the palace, forms the short end of the palace's town-facing cour d'honneur. The Gallery Wing stretches from the southeastern corner tower to the Rhine, and contains two notable gates which still carry automobile traffic.

Perhaps the most architecturally notable portion of the palace is one of these gates, the Koblenz Gate. Its exuberant late baroque exterior clearly distinguishes it from the strict patterns of the rest of the palace. It was built by Michael Leveilly to the plans of François de Cuvilliés from 1751-1755. It takes the form of a triumphal arch, and features rich use of columns. It is topped by a gilded statue of Michael the Archangel, as the large room above its triple archway originally served as the seat of the Order of St. Michael. Other statues of saints and armorial bearings decorate the gate, which is topped by a lantern.

The most significant restored interior space of the palace is the palace church, which was built in the northeastern end of the palace in 1779 by Johann Heinrich Roth. Ludwig von Beethoven occasionally played in the church as a young organist. Frederick William III donated the space to the Protestant community of Bonn in 1816. Karl Friedrich Schinkel rebuilt its chancel in 1844. Like the rest of the palace, the church was destroyed in the Second World War, but it was rebuilt, including its rich stucco decoration, after the war. It currently serves as parish for the Protestant community of the university. A new Klais organ was installed in the back of the nave in 2012.

== See also ==
Other palaces, residences, and hunting lodges of Clemens August of Bavaria:

- Augustusburg and Falkenlust Palaces, Brühl
- Schloss Herzogsfreude
- Schloss Hirschberg
- Mergentheim Palace
