= Schloss Hirschberg =

Former hunting lodge in Warstein, Germany

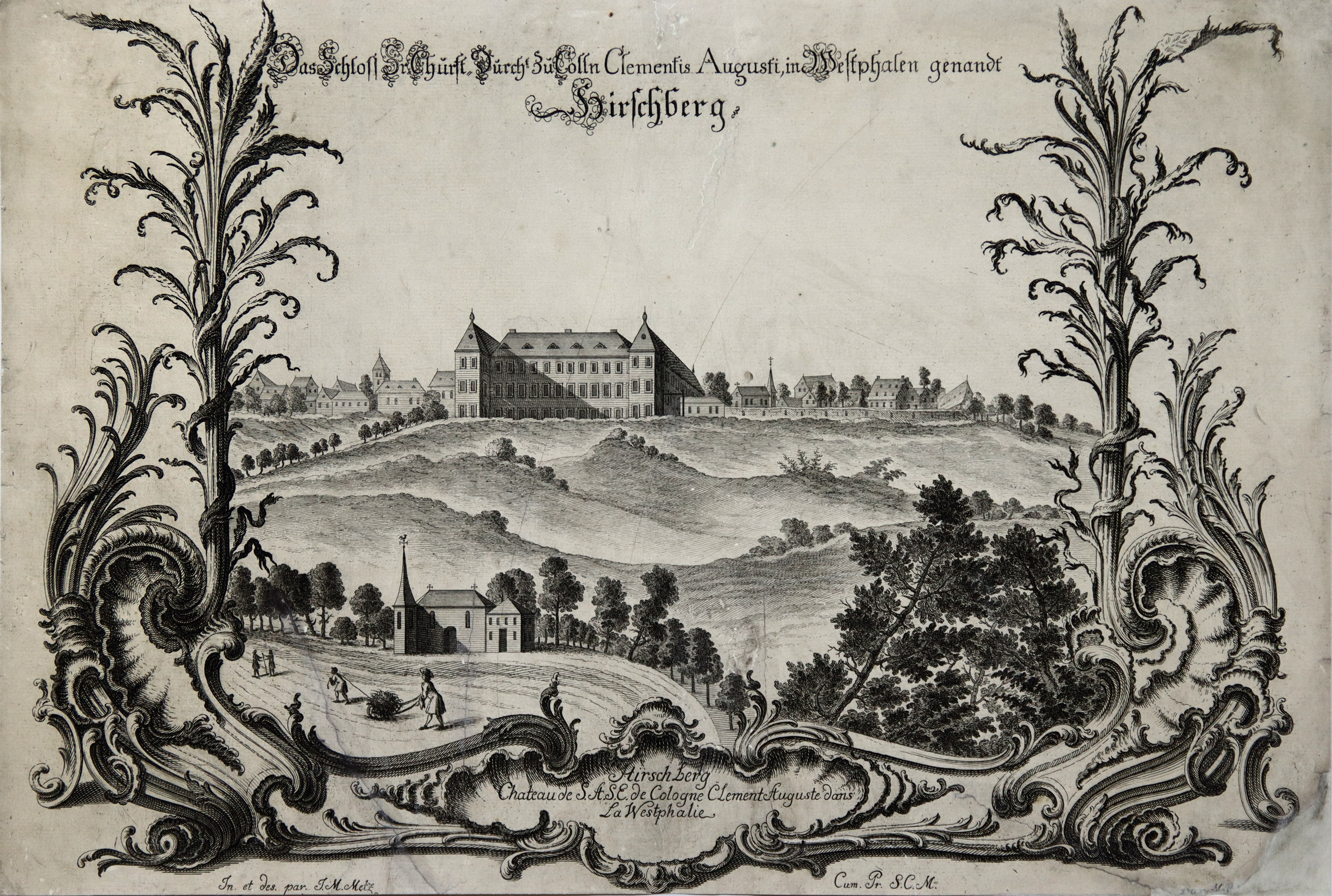
Schloss Hirschberg around 1760

Schloss Hirschberg was once a hunting lodge of the Prince-Electors of Cologne. It was situated in Hirschberg, now part of the Warstein municipality in North Rhine-Westphalia, Germany. Originally built in the Middle Ages, the lodge was replaced by a baroque palace in the 17th century. In the 18th century, Prince-Elector Clemens August of Bavaria commissioned Johann Conrad Schlaun to make several modifications. The lodge became the center for large-scale Par force hunts.

Today, apart from the former stables, the only remaining part of the complex is the main gate from the 18th century. This gate was incorporated in the 19th century into the building complex of the former Wedinghausen Abbey in Arnsberg, where it is now known as the Hirschberg Gate (German: Hirschberger Tor).

== History ==
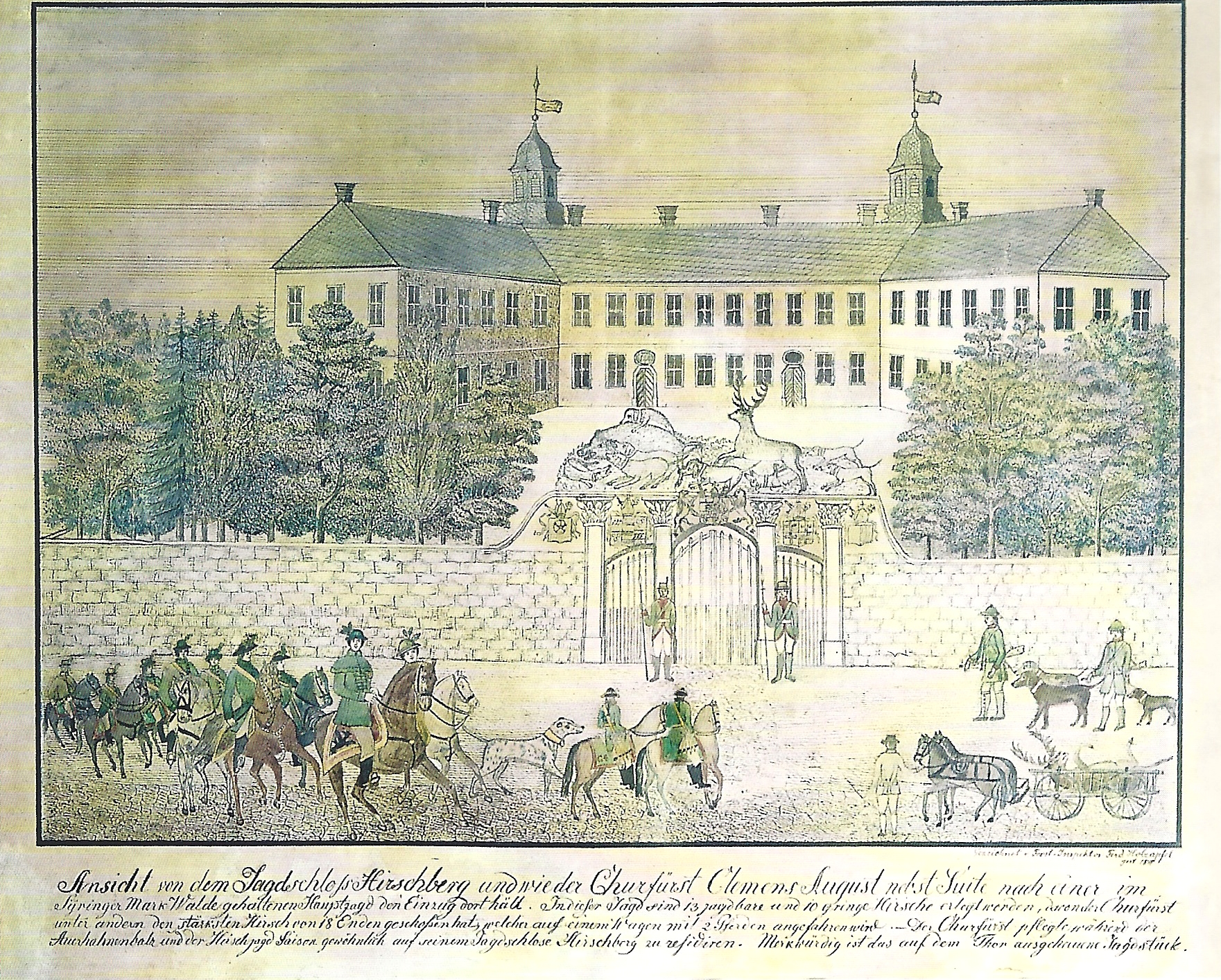
Prince-Elector Clemens August returning from the hunt with Hirschberg in the back and the Hirschberger Tor in front of it

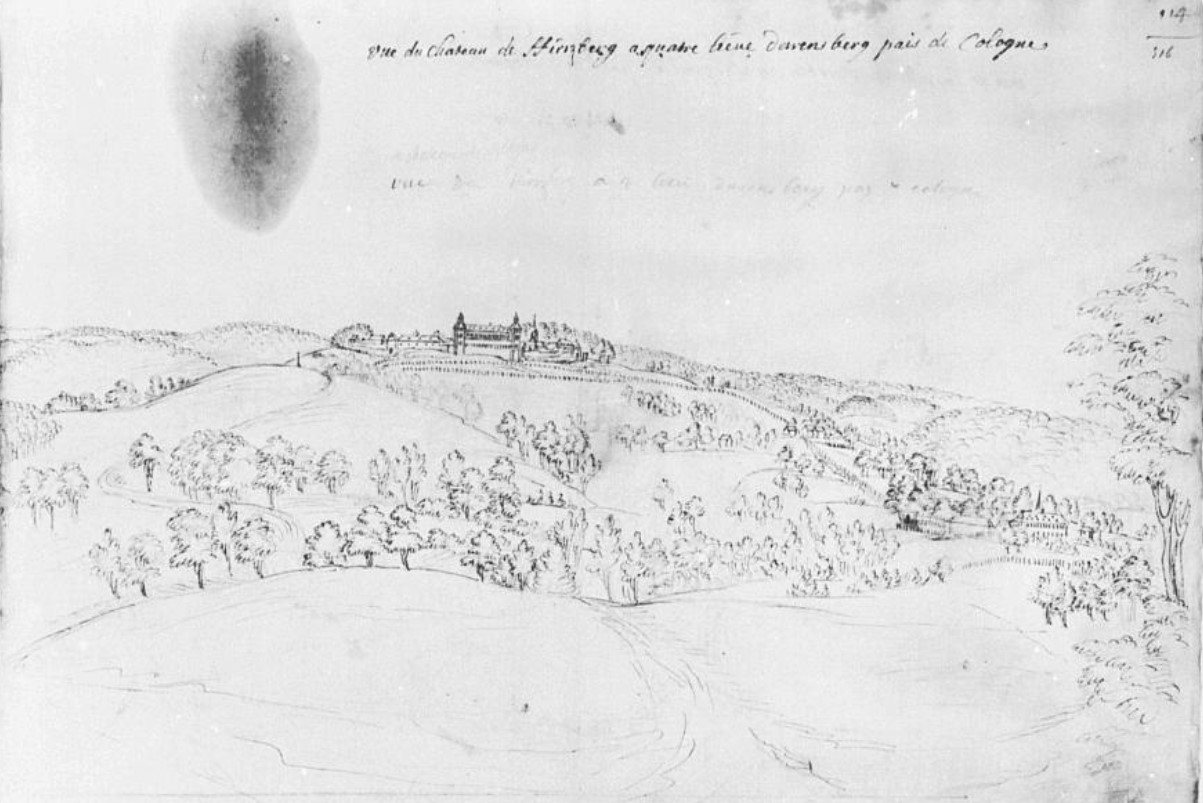
The village and Schloss Hirschberg in the distance by Renier Roidkin

In 1340, Count Gottfried IV of Arnsberg obtained the right from Walram of Jülich, Archbishop of Cologne, to grant Hirschberg town rights and to build a castle there. In 1368, the castle, along with the County of Arnsberg, passed to the Duchy of Westphalia, which was part of the Electorate of Cologne, after which a castle was built in place of the original fortification. This castle was completely destroyed during the Thirty Years' War.

Beginning in 1662, Prince-Elector Maximilian Henry of Bavaria commissioned the construction of a new palace on this site, intended primarily as a base for princely hunts. The architect, master builder Frater Bonitius from Trier, completed the building in 1668.

The plan was for a four-winged structure with four pavilion towers at the corners. However, the work likely remained unfinished, as by 1691 only a three-winged complex with two towers existed. The stables were built to the south of the castle.

The lodge was described by contemporaries as nearly as grand as nearby Arnsberg Castle. However, by the time of Prince-Elector Joseph Clemens of Bavaria, the structure had already begun to deteriorate. A document from 1691 notes that parts of the castle required rebuilding.

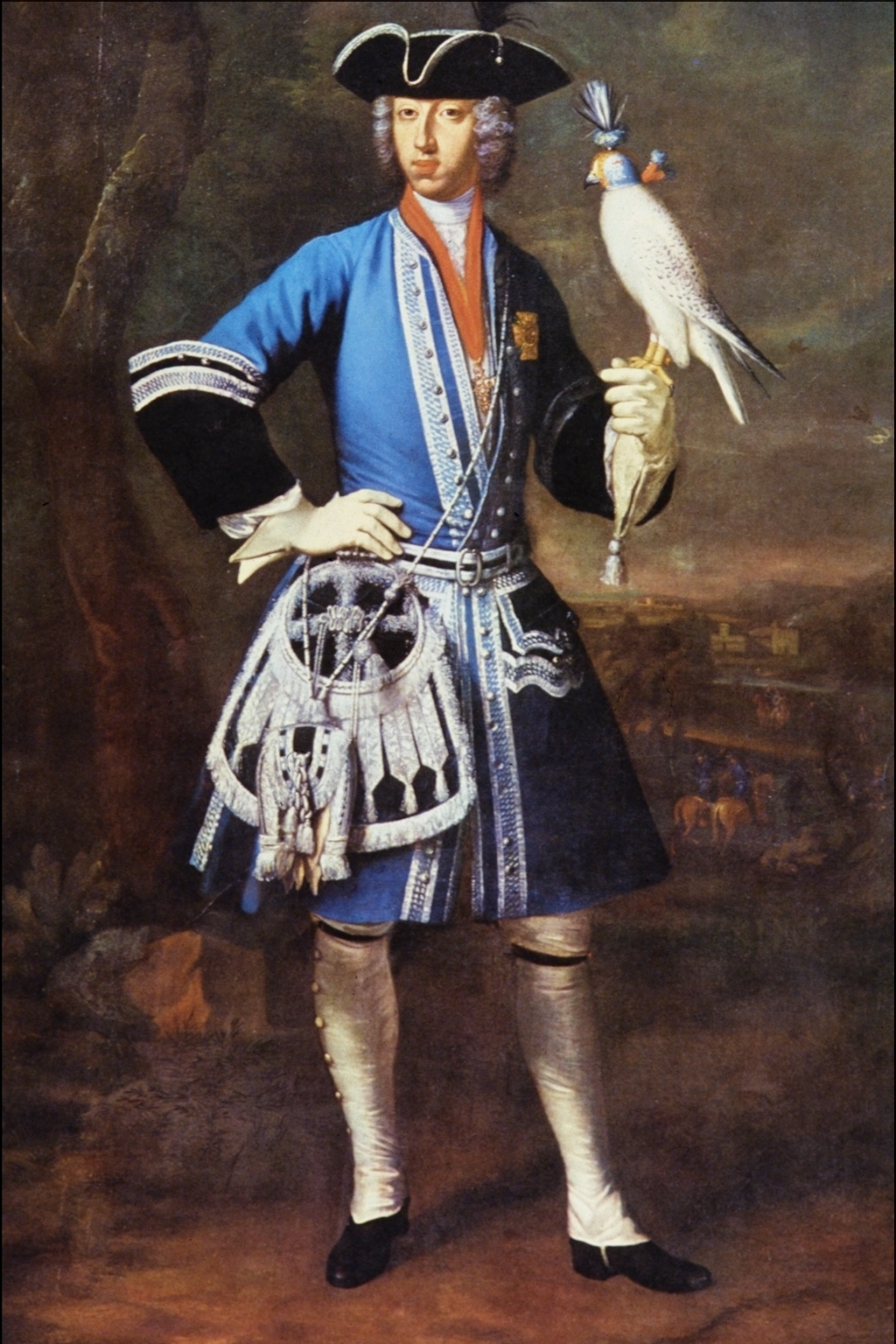
Prince-Elector Clemens August of Bavaria as a falconer

During his reign, Prince-Elector Clemens August I of Bavaria had Schloss Hirschberg modernized. Unlike the extensive renovations at Arnsberg Castle, Johann Conrad Schlaun's work at Hirschberg primarily focused on redesigning the interiors. Additionally, Clemens August commissioned the construction of the so-called Hirschberg Gate in 1753, which closed off the open side of the courtyard in the three-winged complex.

During Clemens August's reign, Schloss Hirschberg had its golden age, hosting numerous large hunts, particularly the so-called par force hunts. It was also during this period that several small chapels and hunting lodges were constructed, where the Prince-Elector would have Mass celebrated following the hunts. These additions further enhanced the palace's role as a center of both hunting and courtly life, reflecting Clemens August's passion for the sport and his devotion to religious observance.

‘Par force’ hunts were grand theatrical events, meticulously planned to demonstrate power and greatness. Clemens August and his guests participated in the hunt, or positioned themselves centrally in the forest while they waited to be summoned. Meanwhile, the mounted hunters and their hounds pursued the day's quarry. From their waiting place, the Prince-Elector and his guests could watch the hunters, horses and hounds as they persecuted the frantic stag at great speed. When the exhausted stag was no longer able to run, the dogs held it fast by biting its throat, ears, legs and muzzle. Thus, the stag was “fixed” and the Prince-Elector was summoned with a special horn signal. He carried out his duty as the master of the hunt by killing the stag with a stab wound to the heart.

== Architecture ==
The construction history of the building is exceptionally difficult to reconstruct. While archival materials from the time of construction have survived, they provide little information about the final structure that was built.

Visitors entered the inner courtyard through the Hirschberg Gate at the end of the Schlossstraße, which led to the castle. A grand Baroque entrance gate, with a set of steps leading up to it, provided access to the building. Above the portal, flanked by pilasters, the electoral coat of arms served as an upper embellishment.

The two-story, strictly symmetrical main structure featured two short side wings and rested on a high base. A gabled roof covered with slate extended over the side wings, completing the upper section. Chimneys and dormers added interest to the roofline. Flanking corner towers, built on a square footprint and topped with Baroque domes, emphasized the corners of the building. The individual floors were separated by belt cornices, and local rubble stones were used as the primary building material, with the windows framed by surrounds.

An inventory from 1761 mentions the Elector's apartment, the dining hall, the billiard room, and a chapel. The upper floor housed simply furnished bedrooms.

== Hirschberger Tor ==
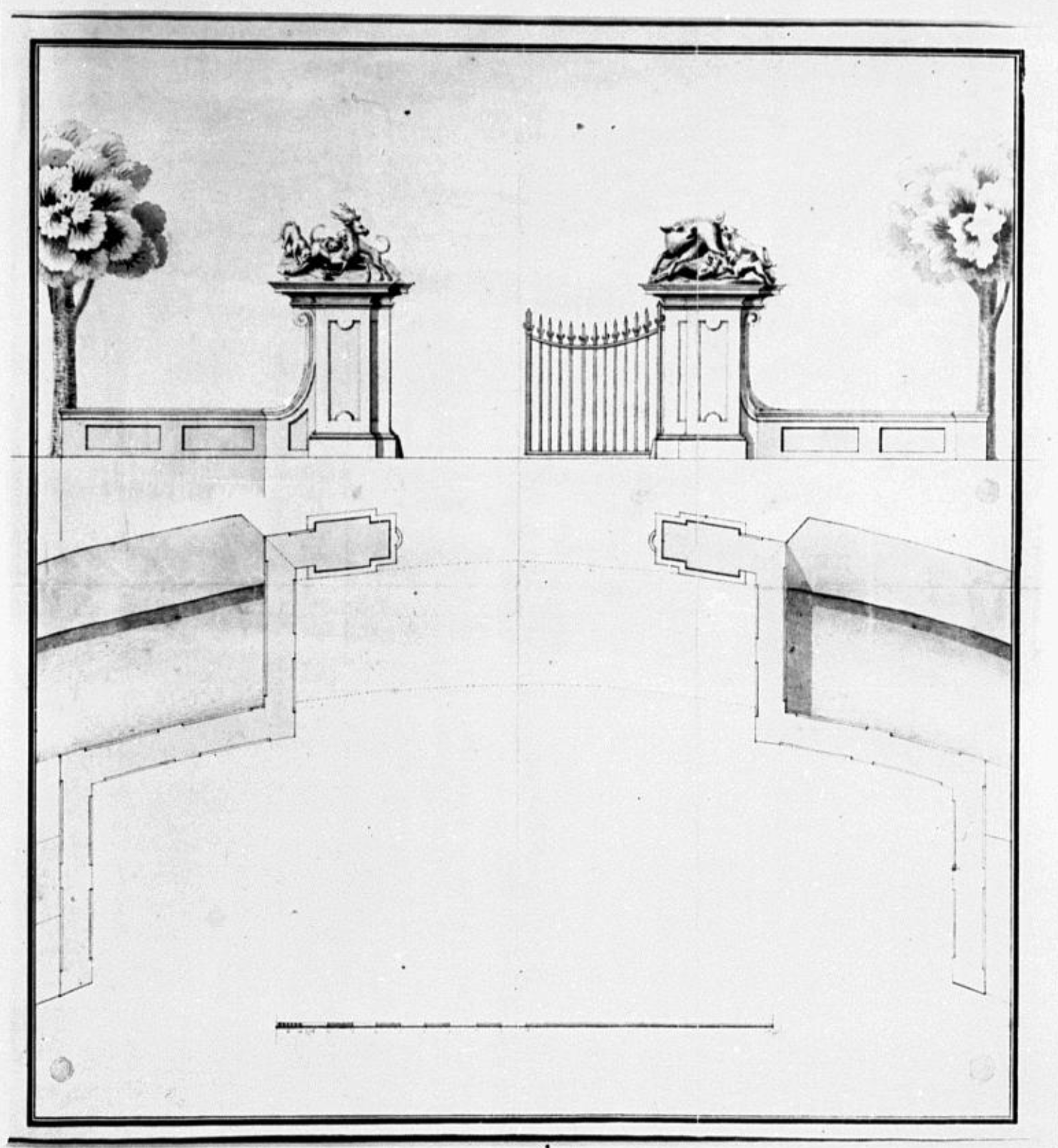
Design for the Hirschberger Tor by Johan Conrad Schlaun

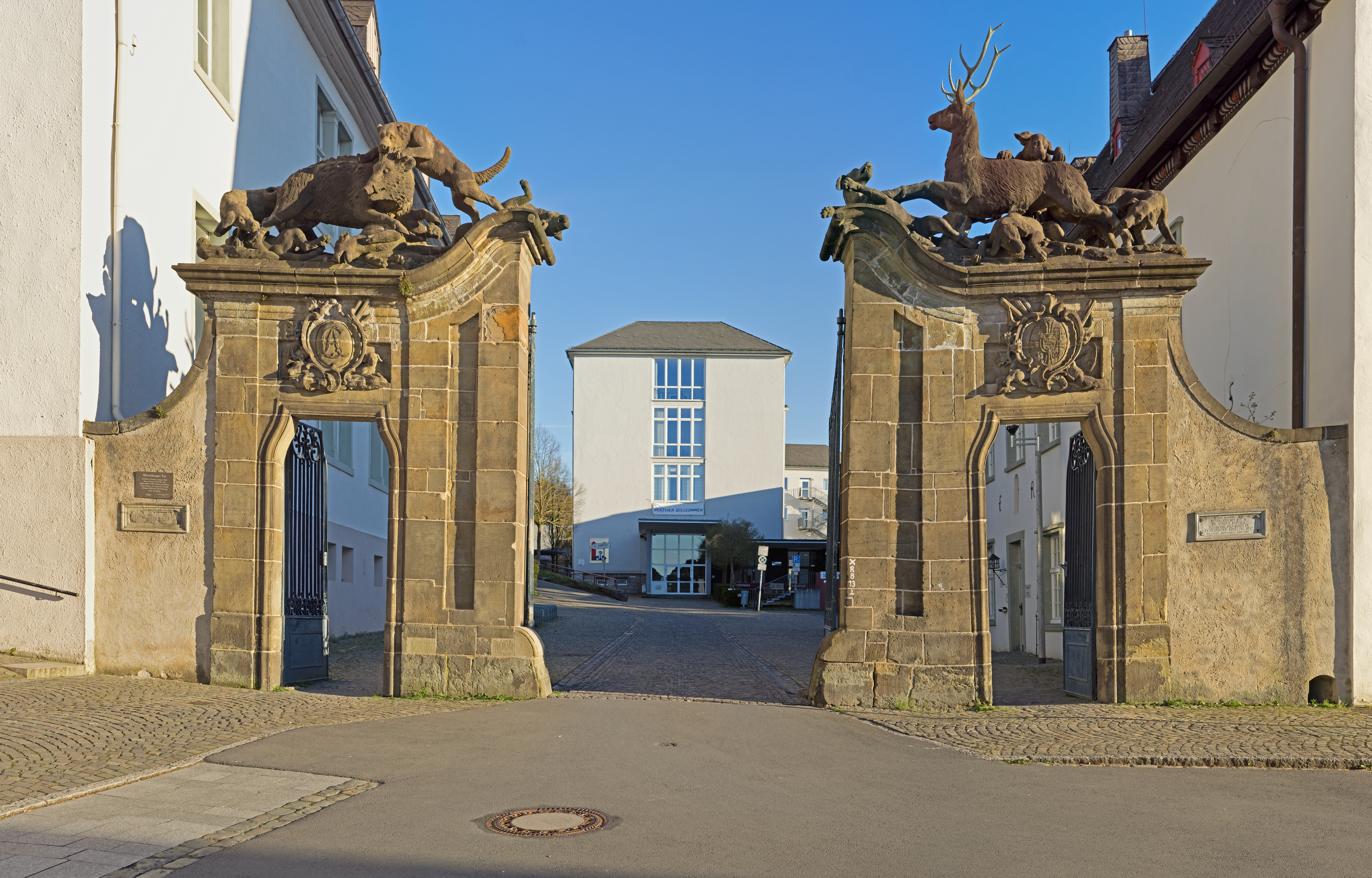
The Hirschberger Tor at its current location in Arnsberg

In 1753, Prince-Elector Clemens August commissioned the construction of a grand entrance gate made from Rüthen sandstone, the so-called Hirschberg Gate, which closed off the open side of the courtyard in the three-winged complex. The design was by Johann Conrad Schlaun, while the sculptural decorations depicting hunting scenes were created by the Rhenish sculptor Johann Christoph Manskirch.

The gate features three sections: a wide central entrance flanked by two smaller side entrances. Atop the gate, two hunting scenes are depicted, while additional reliefs adorn the structure. On the right side, a large electoral coat of arms is displayed, and on the left, the intertwined initials "CA," embellished with hunting motifs. Inside the gate, on the left side, the following inscription about the building's patron is displayed:

“CLEMENZ: AUGUST: D(ei): G(ratia): ARCHIEP(iscopus)S: COL(oniensis): S(arcri): R(omani): IMP(erii): P(er) ITAL(iam): ARCHICA(ncellarius): ET: EL(ector): LEG(atus): NAT(us): S(anctae): SED(is): AP(ostolicae): AD(ministrator): SUP(remus): BOR(ussiae): ORD(inis): TEUT(onici): P(er) GERM(aniam): ITAL(iam): TRA(n)SMARI(num)Q(ue): PRAEF(ectus): EP(iscopus): HIL(desheimensis): PAD(erbornensis): MO(nasteriensis): E(t): OSN(abrugenesis): UTRIUSQ(ue): BAVA(riae): SUP(erioris): PAL(atinatus): WEST(phaliae): ET: UNG(ariae): DUX: ETC: ETC.”

On the right side, it reads: "PORTAS EX FVNDAMENTO EXTRAVCTAS HIS STATVIS EXORNARI CVRAVAT." The highlighted letters, when added together as Roman numerals, indicate the construction year of 1753.

== Decline ==
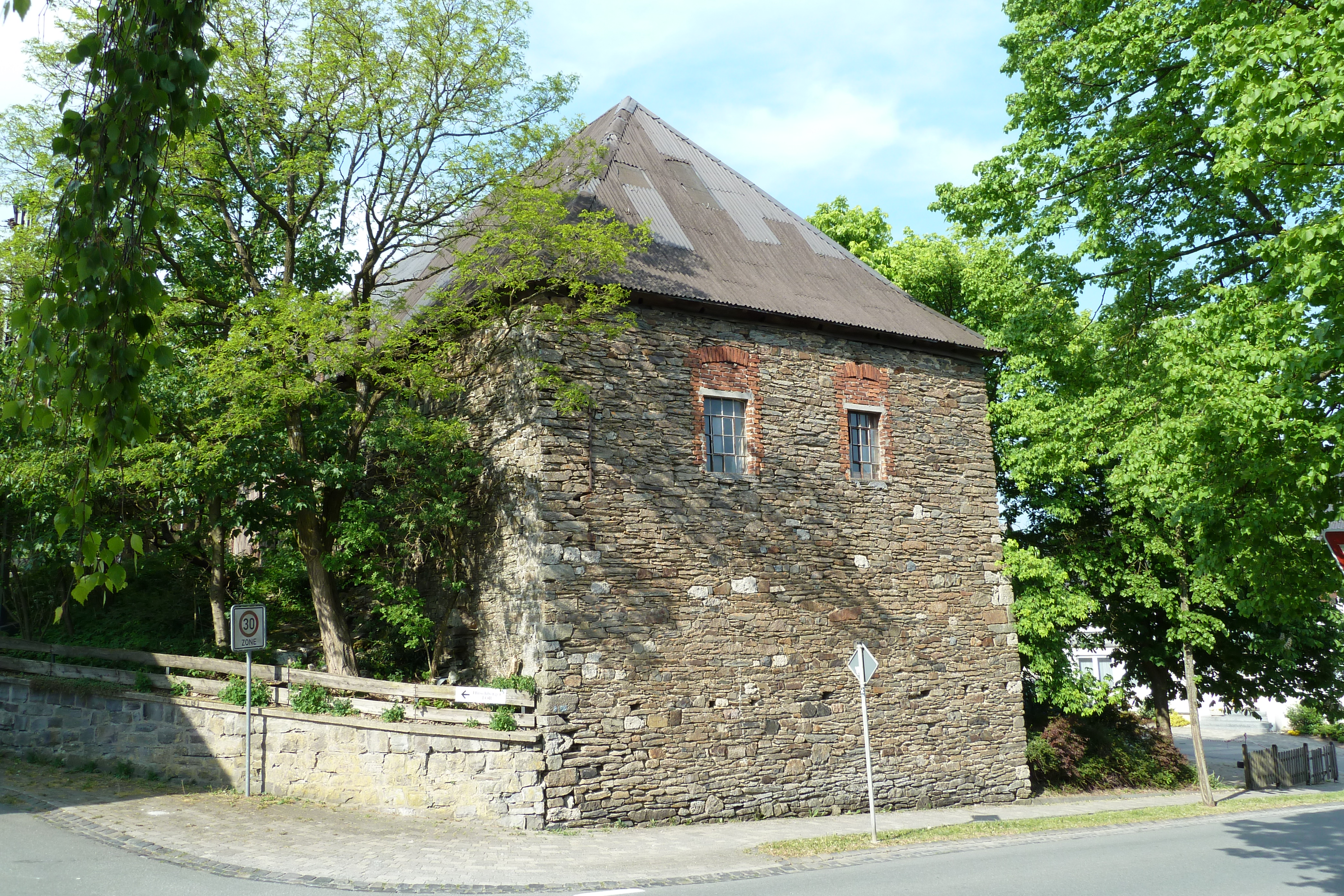
The former stable of Schloss Hirschberg

After the death of Clemens August I of Bavaria, interest in Schloss Hirschberg from the Prince-Electors of Cologne dwindled, and large hunts were rarely held. The estate was managed by a burgrave, with hunting activities overseen by several forestry officials. As the buildings were neglected, they gradually fell into disrepair.

In 1788, a fire severely damaged the castle. When the Duchy of Westphalia passed to Hesse-Darmstadt in 1802, the new administration considered restoration too expensive. As a result, the castle was sold for demolition that same year. Only one wing, including the stables, was preserved and repurposed as a residence for the forester.

== Reconstruction of the Hirschberger Tor ==
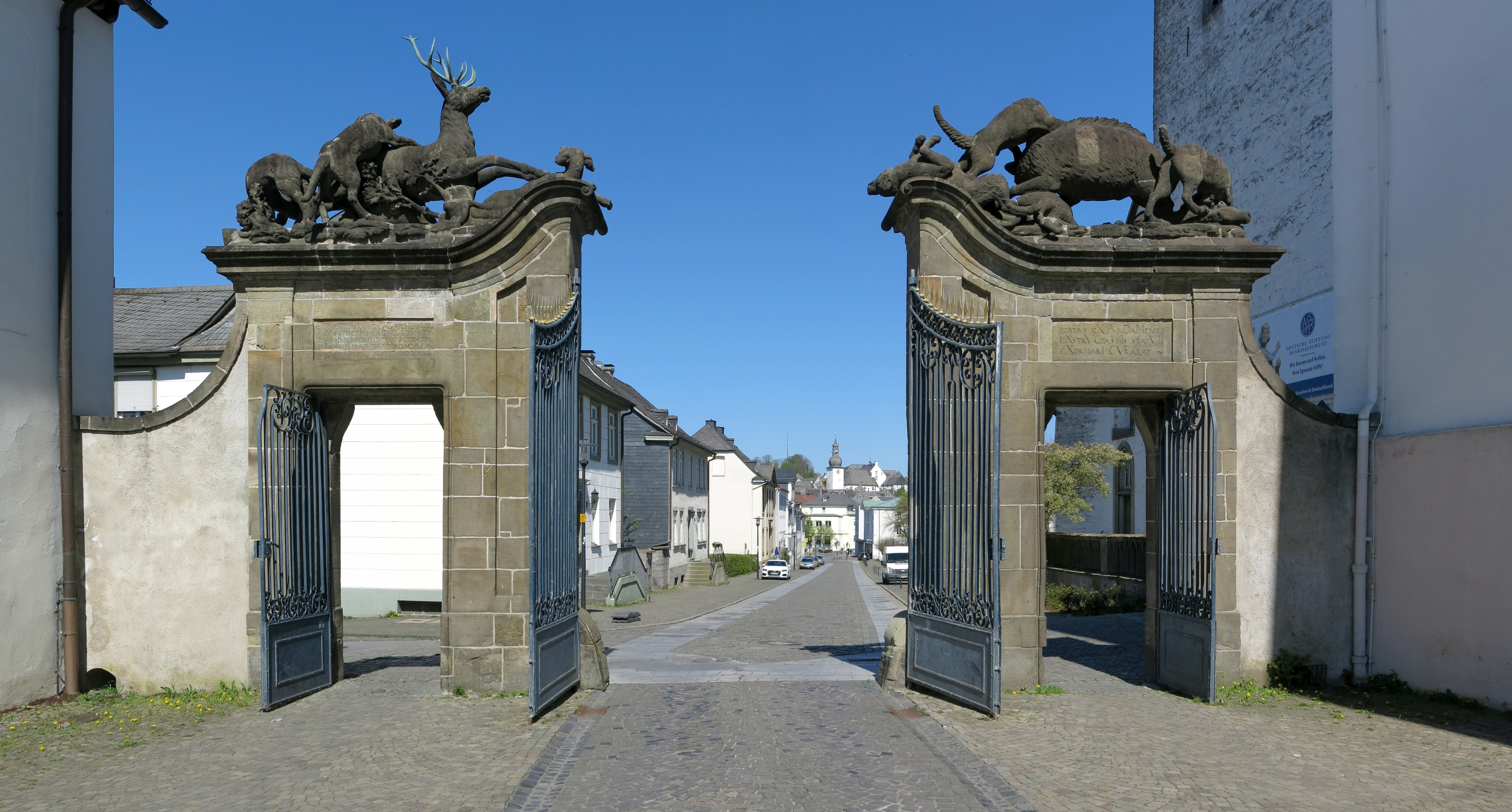
The Hirschberger Tor at its current location in Arnsberg

Initially, the gate remained at its original location. Even after Prussian rule began in 1816, the gate was largely ignored. In 1824, a survey of art monuments brought the gate to the attention of the district administrator Franz Anton Thüsing, who proposed relocating it to Arnsberg.

The location of the gate was the subject of much debate in the local newspaper. The final decision came when the Upper Building Deputation ordered a wing of the former Wedinghausen Monastery to be demolished for fire safety reasons. The gate was erected in this spot, with its dismantling, transport, and reconstruction partially funded by private donations.

After the gate was reassembled in Arnsberg, a plaque, known as the Beckermann Tablet, was added to the exterior. It commemorates the failed attack of General Beckermann on Arnsberg during the Thirty Years' War: "Through lightning and rain, by God's blessing, on St. Norbert's night, Beckermann was driven away." In 1893, another plaque was added to commemorate the 250th anniversary of Laurentianum Gymnasium: "By God's grace – the school thrived – teacher and scholar – 250 years."

Also preserved is the Hubertus altar from the castle chapel, which is now located in the parish church of St. Christoph in Warstein-Hirschberg.

== Literature ==
- feaux de Lacroix, Karl (1896). "Jagdschloss Hirschberg und Umgebung". Westfälische Geschichtsblätter (Band 2) (in German): 8–12.
- Sandgathe, Günter (1986). "Jagd und Politik am Hoflager des Kurfürsten Clemens August im Herzogtum Westfalen (1724-1761)" (PDF). Westfälische Zeitschrift (in German). 136: 335–389.
- Fischer, Ferdy; Anneser, Toni (1992). Castles looking down from the hills Stately Homes dreaming in the valleys. Münster: Aschendorf Verlag. pp. 122–123. ISBN 3-402-06046-9.
- Funke, Jürgen (2020). "Das Hirschberger Tor stand acht Jahre lang auch wieder in Hirschberg". Heimatblätter (in German). 41. Zeitschrift des Arnsberger Heimatbundes: 90–93.

== See also ==
Other palaces, residences and hunting lodges of Clemens August of Bavaria;

- Schloss Ahaus
- Arnsberg Castle
- Augustusburg and Falkenlust Palaces, Brühl
- Clemenswerth Palace
- Electoral Palace, Bonn
- Schloss Herzogsfreude
- Schloss Liebenburg
- Mergentheim Palace
- Schloss Neuhaus in Paderborn
- Osnabrück Palace
- Poppelsdorf Palace in Bonn
- Schloss Sassenberg
- Vinea Domini in Bonn
- Amtshaus Wiedenbrück (also known as Burg Reckenberg)
