= Schloss Münster =

Palace in Münster, Germany

Coordinates: 51.9637°N 7.6131°E

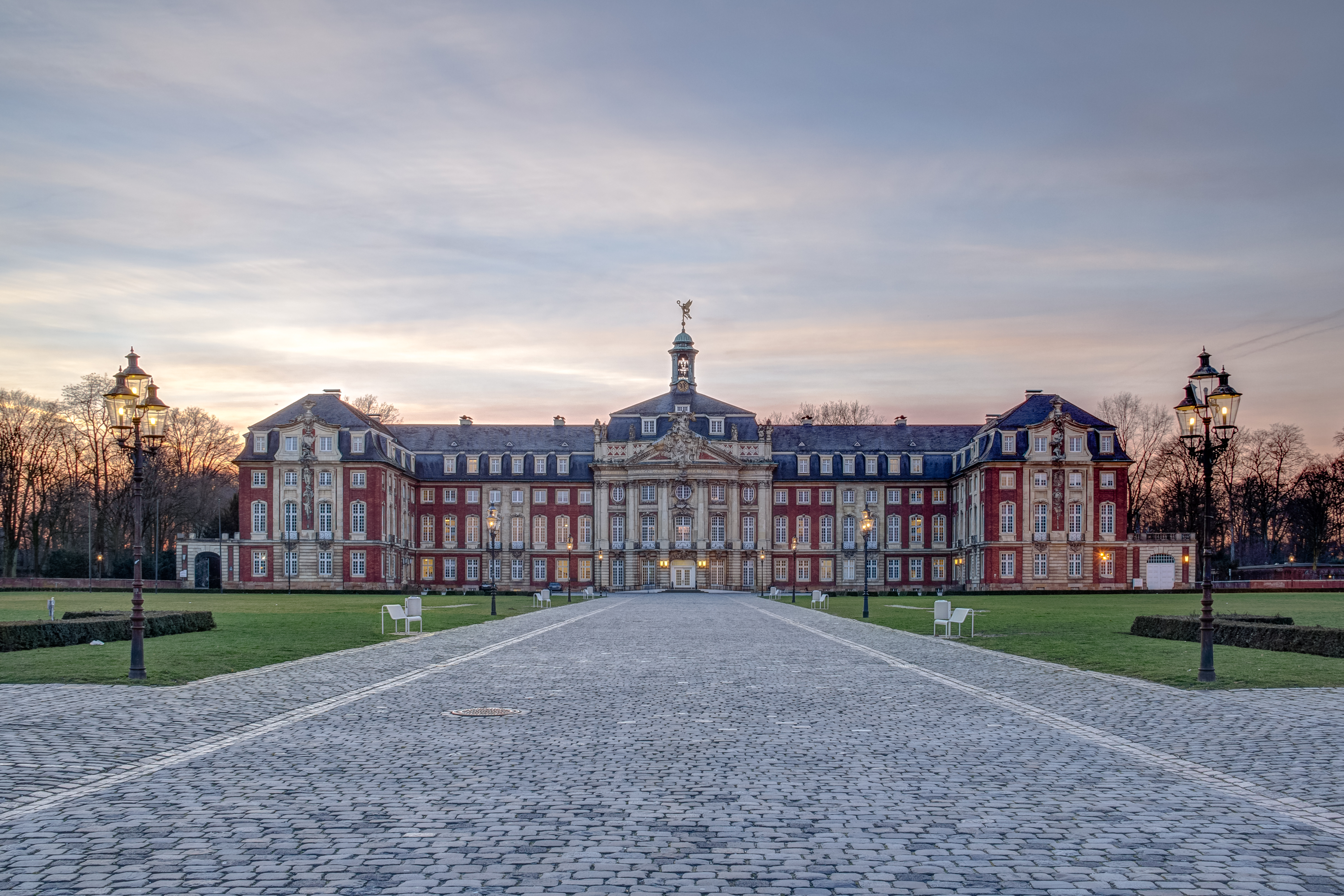
Fürstbischöfliches Schloss Münster

Schloss Münster, officially Fürstbischöfliches Schloss Münster, is the schloss built as the residence of the prince-bishop of Münster, modern-day North Rhine-Westphalia, Germany. It was built between 1767 and 1787 in baroque style as a mansion for the last but one prince-bishop Maximilian Friedrich von Königsegg-Rothenfels. The architect was Johann Conrad Schlaun. Since 1954 it has been the seat and landmark of the University of Münster. The castle is built from the typical Baumberger sandstone of Münster.
