= Johann Conrad Schlaun =

German architect

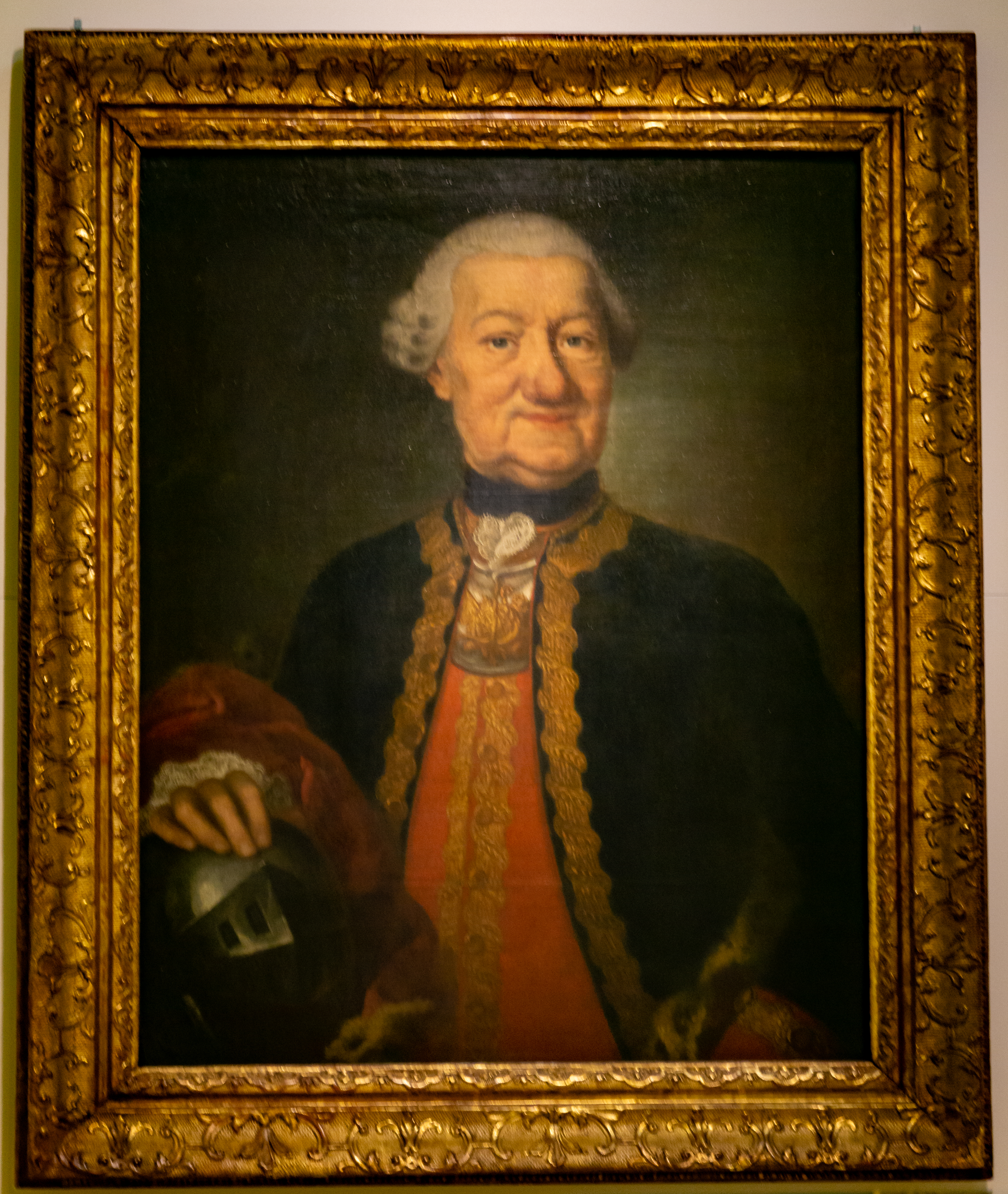
Portrait of Johann Conrad Schlaun, attributed to Matthias Kappers, ca. 1765

Johann Conrad Schlaun (June 5, 1695, in Nörde now Warburg – October 21, 1773, in Münster) was a German architect. He is an important architect of the Westphalian Baroque architectural style. His designs include the Erbdrostenhof and Schloss, both in Münster, but also Arnsberg Castle.

== Life ==
Johann Conrad Schlaun was born on June 5, 1695, as the son of Henrich Schluen and his wife Agnes Berendes in Nörde. He was baptized three days later in Ossendorf, Warburg. Between 1706/7 and fall 1712, he visited the Gymnasium Theodorianum in Paderborn that he left without a degree. Later, he followed a military career. For the year of 1713 a payment to his father is documented for the purpose of his education in architecture. On June 22, 1715, he was appointed an artillery lieutenant and engineer of the Prince-Bishopric of Paderborn. In 1717, he is attested in the Prince-Bishopric of Münster where is appointed a land measurer in 1720. His first significant work was the Capuchin church in Brakel.

== Works ==
- Arnsberg Castle
- Augustusburg Palace in Brühl
- Clemenswerth Palace
- Schloss Hirschberg
- Schloss Münster

== Literature ==
- Boer, Hans-Peter; Buske, Stefan (1995). J. C. Schlaun. Sein Leben, seine Zeit, sein Werk (in German). Illustrator: Andreas Lechtape (2nd ed.). Münster: Aschendorff Verlag. ISBN 978-3-402-05108-5. OCLC 231633897. OL 912571M. Wikidata Q115795204.
