= Engelbert Seibertz (architect) =

German architect

Franz Engelbert Josef Maria Seibertz (22 February 1856, Brilon - 17 February 1929, Berlin) was a historicist German architect.

== Life ==
Engelbert Seibertz was a grandson of the lawyer and Westphalian historian Johann Suibert Seibertz and a nephew of the painter Engelbert Seibertz, who shared the same name.

Seibertz lived and worked in Berlin, where he made a name for himself as an architect of Catholic churches from the 1880s onwards. Many of his buildings are characterized by their resemblance to the brick Gothic style of the Mark Brandenburg. Numerous examples of his surviving buildings have recently been listed as historic monuments (D). Between 1903 and 1905, he was a city councilor and member of the building committee in the then still independent city of Charlottenburg. He lived in the house he designed at Uhlandstraße 171/172 in Charlottenburg. He was buried in Berlin's St. Matthias Cemetery.
