= Schlosspark, Brühl =

Park in Brühl

Schlosspark
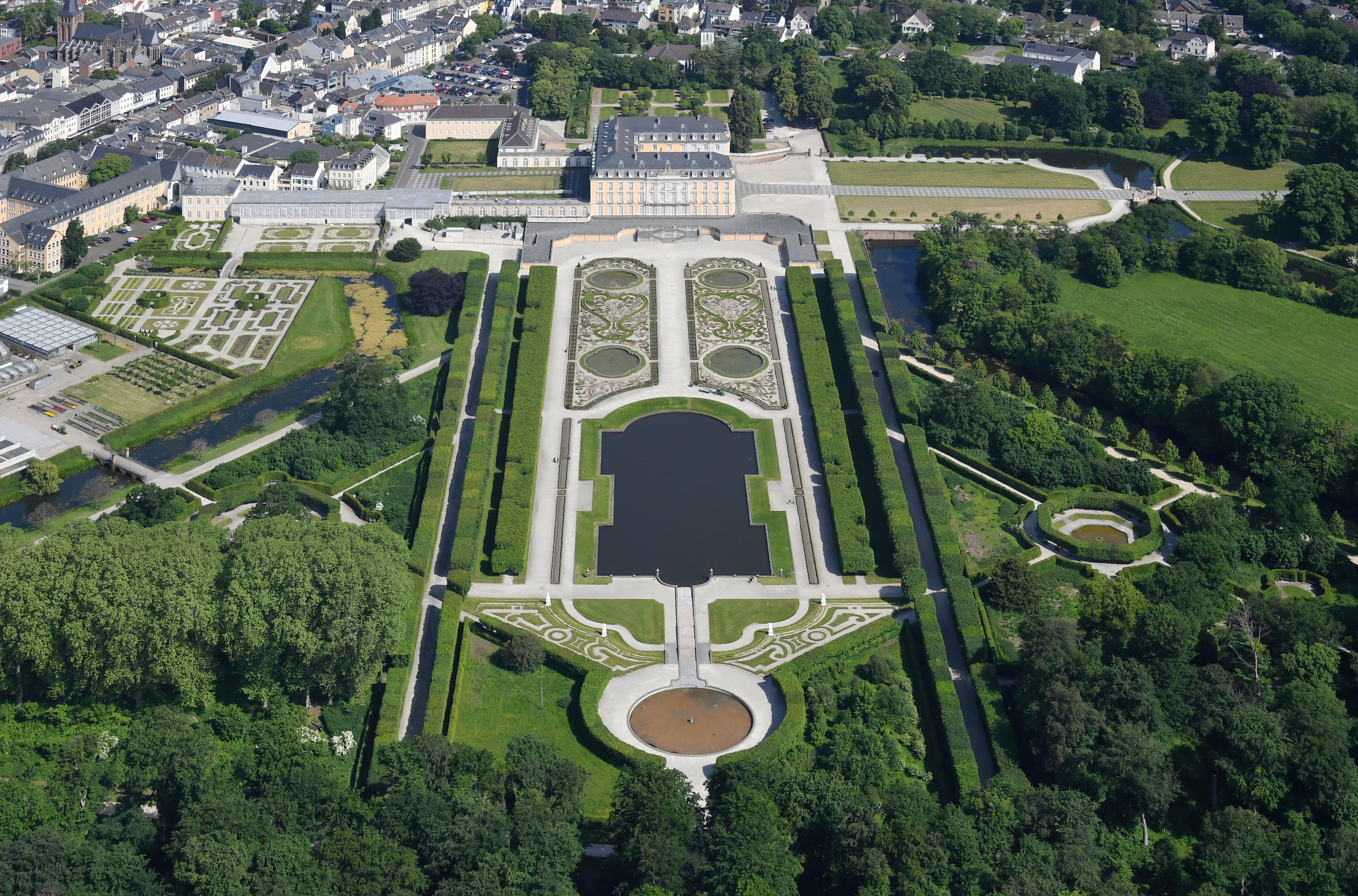
- Aerial view of the parterre garden, 2023
- Interactive map of Schlosspark
- Location: Brühl, North Rhine-Westphalia, Germany
- Coordinates: 50°49′39″N 6°54′29″E
- Established: 1728; 298 years ago
- Website: www.schlossbruehl.de/en/gardens-park/

The Schlosspark (Palace park) is the park of Schloss Augustusburg, a Baroque palace in Brühl, North Rhine-Westphalia, Germany. The garden was first designed in Baroque style by Dominique Girard, and established in 1728. It was partly changed to English landscape style during the 19th century. In the 1930s, the original design was restored. It is now a public park. The complete ensemble of palaces and gardens is a UNESCO World Heritage Site.

== History ==
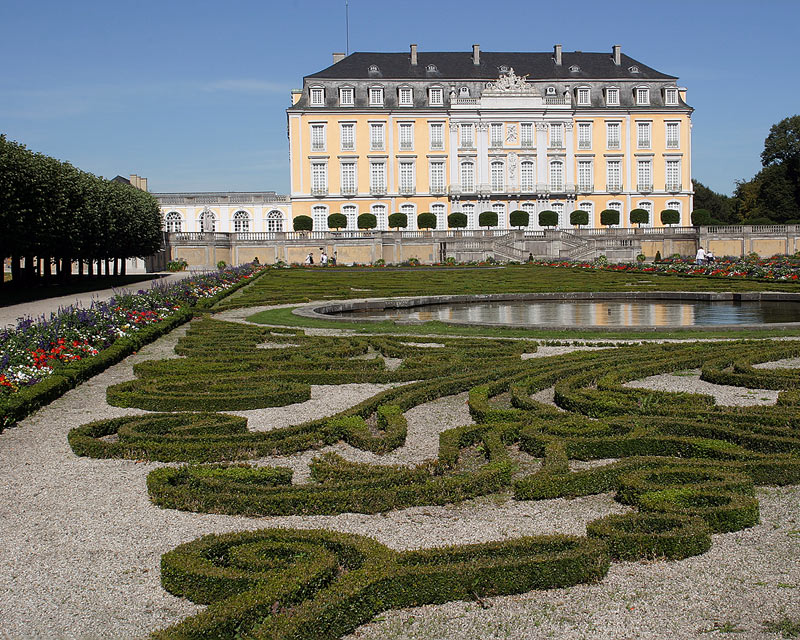
Augustusburg, south facade with parterre

A large formal symmetrical parterre garden was established south of the palace. It was designed by Dominique Girard, a pupil of André Le Nôtre, who came to Brühl in 1727. His 1728 design, titled "garten-dessein", has been preserved in the schloss. South of the building, a symmetry "embroidery" parterre was structured by two pools with fountains on each side, and another large pool, the Mirror Pool, with fountains at the end, separating the parterre from the surrounding forest section.

Commissioned by Friedrich Wilhelm IV of Prussia, Peter Joseph Lenné changed the forest sections around the parterre to an English landscape garden, beginning in 1842. He also created a connection lined with linden trees to Schloss Falkenlust. In the 1930s, the Baroque parterre was restored according to the preserved original plans. The work was performed from 1933 to 1935, supervised by Georg Potente. Further restoration and partly new design was performed after World War II, and especially from 1983.

Because of its careful restoration to the historic plans, the Schlosspark is regarded as one of few authentic examples of Baroque French garden architecture of the 18th century in Europe, and a historic monument of international importance. It is part of the Straße der Gartenkunst zwischen Rhein und Maas (road of garden art between Rhein and Maas). The park has been a nature preserve of North Rhine-Westphalia since 1954. In 1984, it became part of the UNESCO World Heritage Site Augustusburg and Falkenlust Palaces, Brühl.
