= Dominique Girard (garden designer) =

French garden designer and water engineer

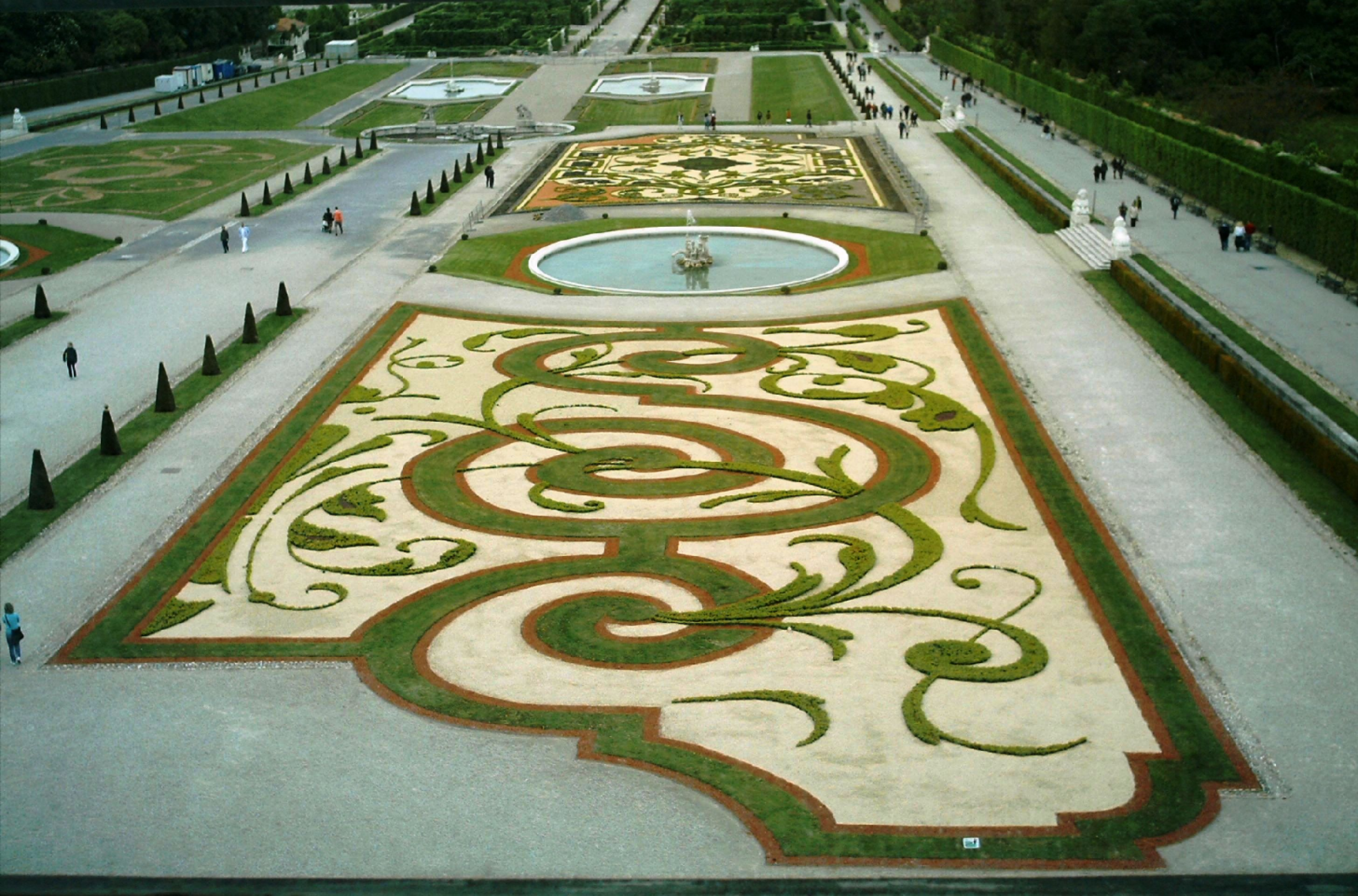
Belvedere Palace's Gardens in Vienna, designed by Dominique Girard.

Dominique Girard (c.1680 – 1738) was a seventeenth-century French garden designer and water engineer.

He was a pupil of André Le Nôtre.
