= Schlosspark Türnich =

German park

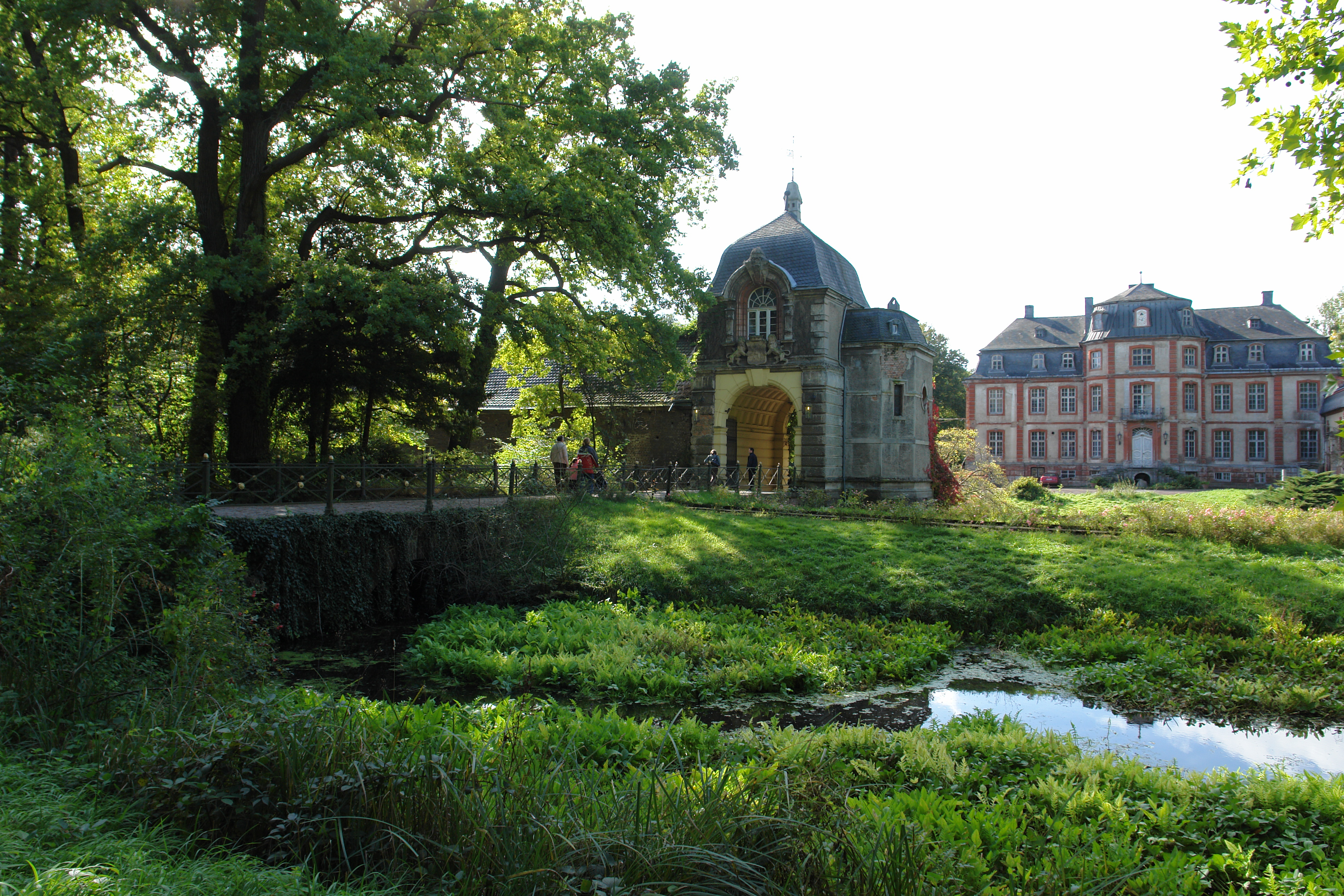
- Schloss Türnich and its gatehouse from across the moat
- Interactive map of Schlosspark Türnich
- Location: Kerpen-Türnich, North Rhine-Westphalia, Germany
- Coordinates: 50°51′50″N 6°44′25″E
- Established: c. 1889
- Website: www.schloss-tuernich.de

Schlosspark Türnich is the park of Schloss Türnich, North Rhine-Westphalia, Germany. The present main building was built from 1757 to 1766 in Baroque style. The English landscape park was begun in the 1790, and extended around 1889. It is managed with a focus on biodiversity. The spacious park with a café is open to the public. The ensemble with a moated palace and chapel, the park and biological-dynamic agriculture is a monument of national importance.

== History ==
Schloss Türnich was built from 1757 to 1766 as a Baroque schloss, probably designed by Michael Leveilly, then the French court architect of the Electorate of Cologne. It was augmented in the 1790s by an English landscape garden. The Hoensbroech family acquired the property in 1850 and expanded Schloss and garden by a gatehouse. A chapel was built next to the palace in 1893.

== Park ==
The park features a Baroque garden close to the palace, and an expansive landscape garden beyond the moat surrounding the palace. Both are open to the public. Many narrow paths lead to meadows with singular old trees, and areas of wild herbs. The park is managed according to ecological preservation. It is rich in diverse plants and animals. Endangered animals seen in the park include rare wild bees, Bechstein's bat, and the river kingfisher. An adjacent forest biotope is protected and closed for visitors. A garden of medical plants was created there. The Lindenallee is lined by 101 lime trees.

Access to the gardens and the chapel is free. The garden features a cafe next to the Baroque garden, where produce from the agricultural part is served. Events held in the garden include a summer festival, a harvest festival, guided tours of medical herbs planted in the Baroque garden, and events for children. The ensemble with a moated palace and chapel, a mill, the park, a forest biotope and biological-dynamic agriculture is a historic monument of national importance.
