= Burg Graurheindorf =

Shloss in Bonn

Coordinates: 50.760799°N 7.077343°E

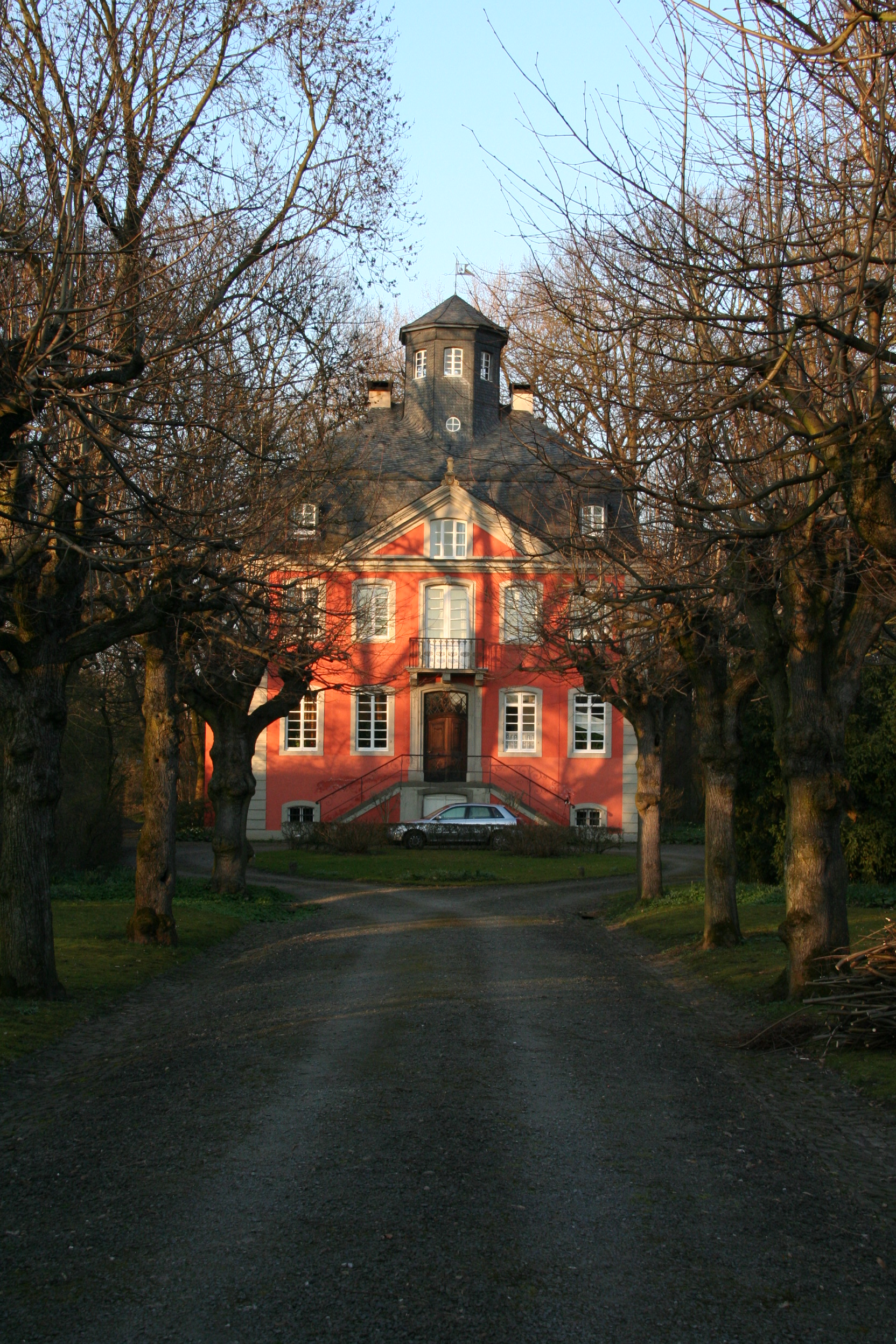
View on Burg Graurheindorf

The Graurheindorfer Burg (also Burg Graurheindorf or Rheindorfer Burg) is a Schloss located in the Graurheindorf district of Bonn.

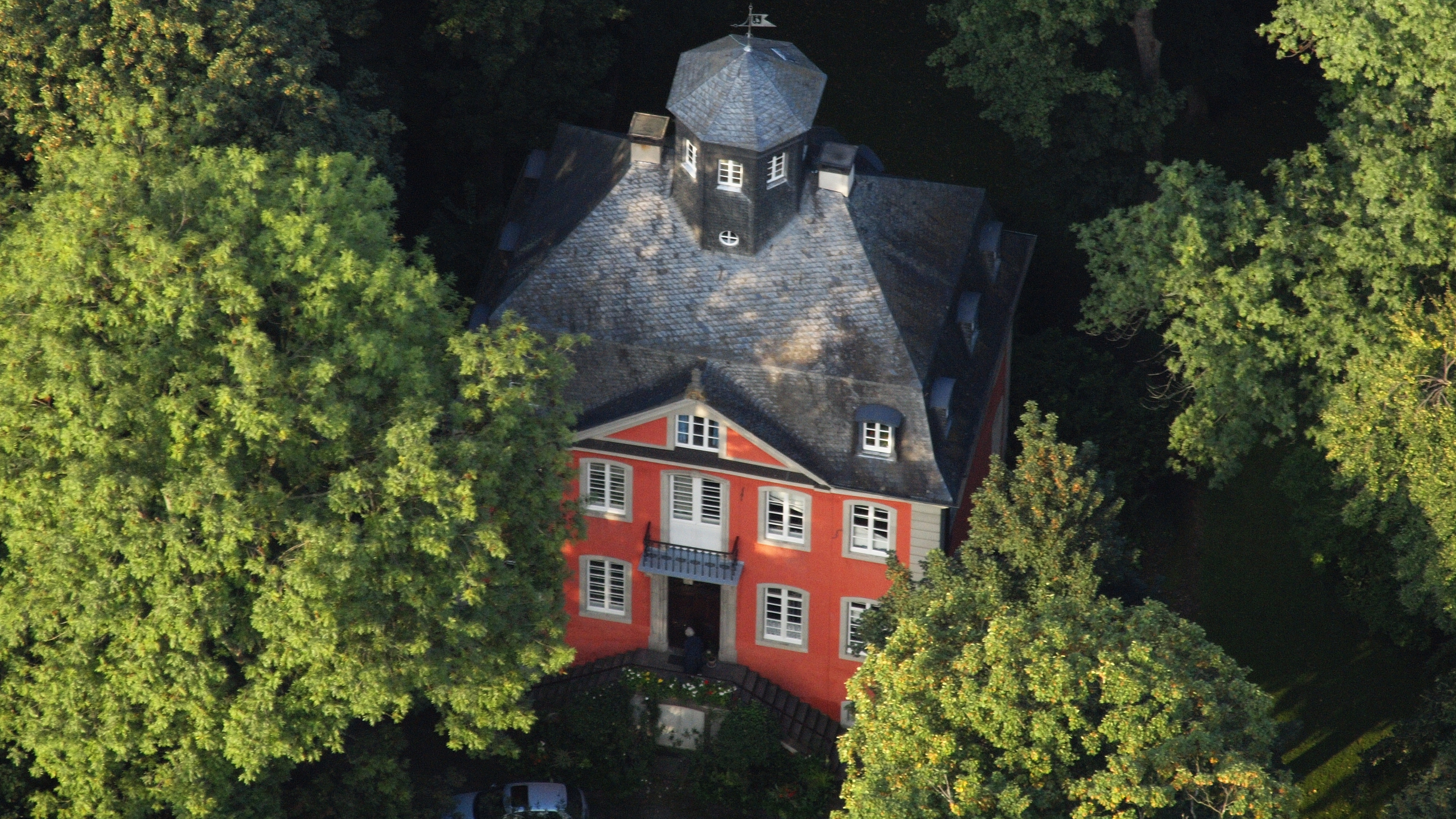
Graurheindorfer Burg

== History ==
On the site of today's mansion there was already a manor house since 1131, which was expanded into a castle around 1478. The present manor house was built in 1755 according to plans by Michael Leveilly of Maria Debèche.

== Architecture ==
The three-story house with an almost square ground plan is located in the middle of a park at the end of an avenue and was built in the style of a small Lustschloss. The façade of the house is structured by Haustein-framed segmental arches. On top of the steep gambrel sits a push-up spire with an octagonal turret. The entrance is reached by a central double-flight staircase.

== Current usage ==
The building is privately owned and used as a dwelling. The castle, the park and a stone path cross stand as a monument under Cultural heritage management.
