= Schloss Haag =

German Castle

Coordinates: 51.534581°N 6.320034°E

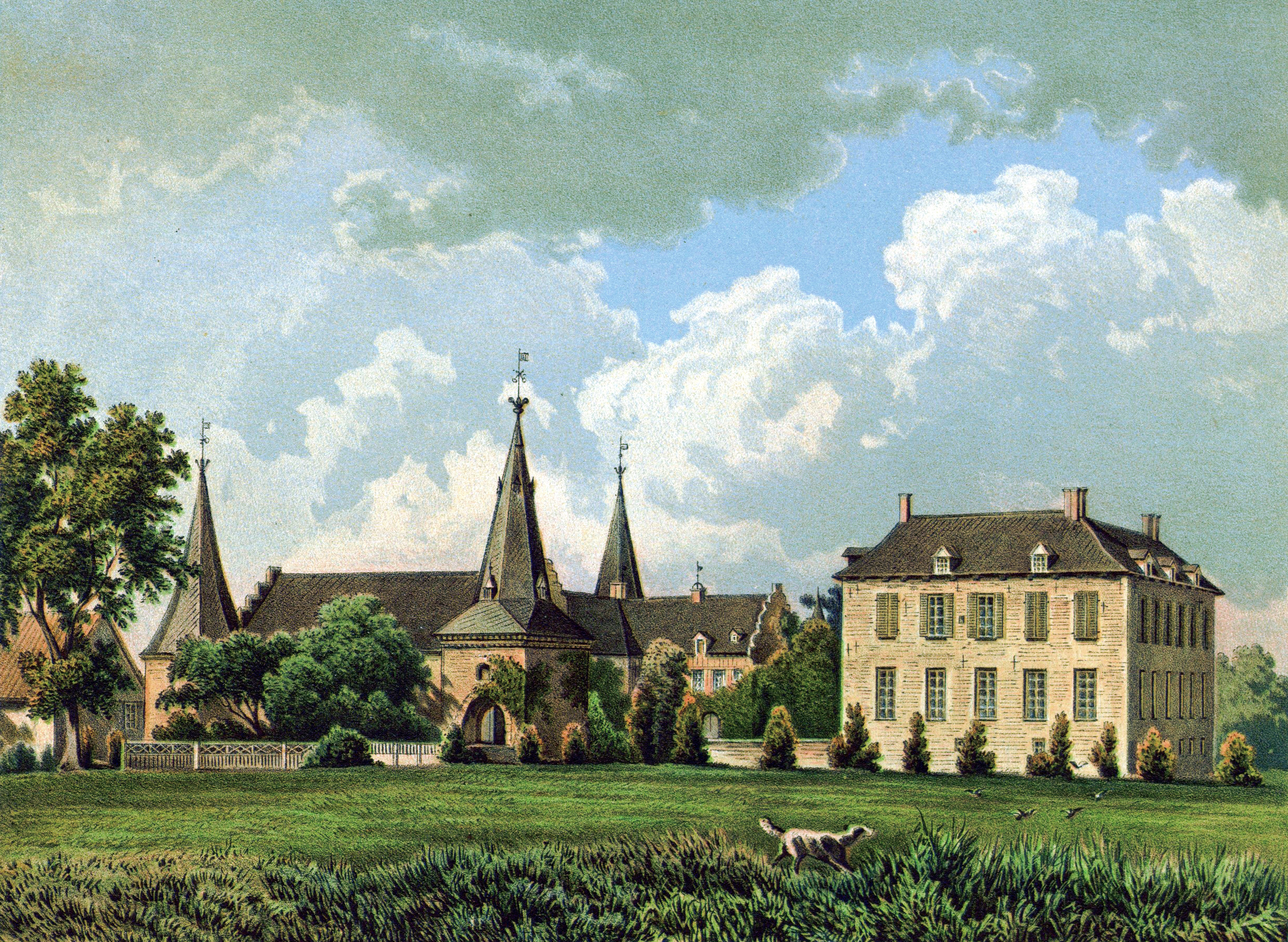
Schloss Haag before the destruction of the main building

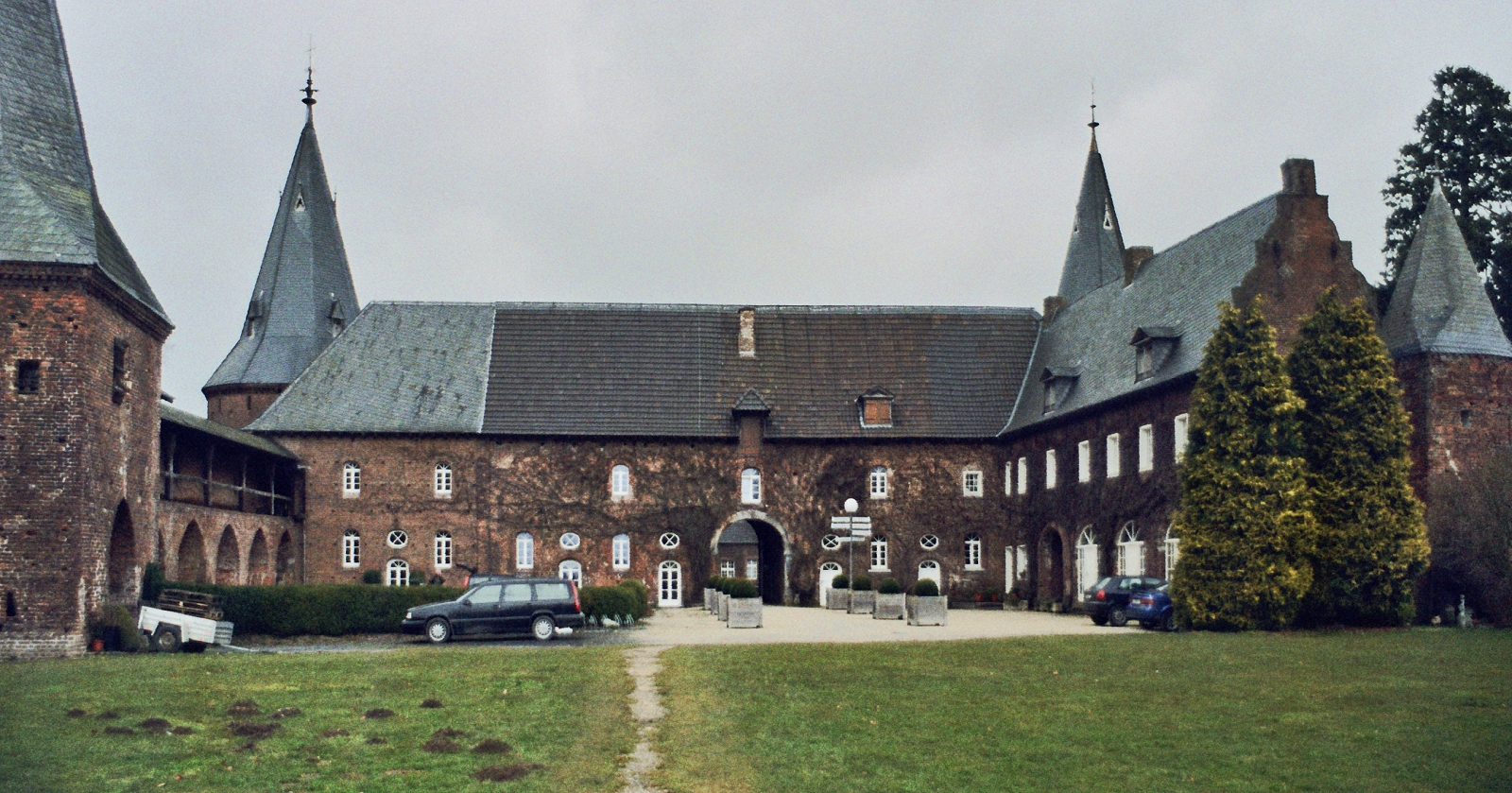
Outer building of Schloss Haag

Castle Haag (German: Schloss Haag) was a moated castle in the Rhineland region of Germany. It is located in Geldern in the district of Kleve, North Rhine-Westphalia. It is owned by the Van Hoensbroeck family.

== History ==
In 1337, the castle is mentioned for the first time. The Van Hoensbroeck family acquired the castle in 1613 and it became their main residence instead of Hoensbroek Castle itself. The family still owns it.

The castle had many famous visitors like the Prussian king Frederick the Great, the French emperor Napoleon in 1804, the Russian emperor Alexander I of Russia in 1814, and William I, German Emperor in 1863.

The castle is today the home of the Hoensbroech family and the center of a golf club.

== Description ==
The castle consisted of a manor house and two outer buildings. The manor house has been rebuilt in baroque style between 1662 and 1664, and in neo-gothic style in 1876/ 1877, but was finally destroyed by an allied bombing during the Second World War. Today only the outer buildings remain.

A description of the life of the fervently ultramontane noble family in the castle in the second half of the 19th century is given in the translation by Alice Zimmern of Count Paul von Hoensbroech's autobiography.

== Bibliography ==
- Rien van den Brand, Stefan Frankewitz (Hrsg.): Das Findbuch zum Archiv Schloss Haag. Einführung - Regesten - Siegel - Register. Geldern/Goch 2008 (Geldrisches Archiv 10. Stichting Historie Peel-Maas-Niersgebied. Nr. 20).
- Paul Clemen (Hrsg.): Die Kunstdenkmäler des Kreises Geldern (= Die Kunstdenkmäler der Rheinprovinz. Band 1, Abt. 2). Schwann, Düsseldorf 1891, S. 166–170 (PDF; 63 MB).
- Ferdinand G. B. Fischer: Ausflugsziele am Niederrhein. Schöne Burgen, Schlösser und Motten. Pomp, Bottrop 2000, ISBN 3-89355-152-2, S. 24–25.
- Gregor Spor: Wie schön, hier zu verträumen. Schlösser am Niederrhein. Pomp, Bottrop, Essen 2001, ISBN 3-89355-228-6, S. 38–39.
- Jens Wroblewski; André Wemmers (2001). Theiss-Burgenführer Niederrhein. Stuttgart: Konrad Theiss. pp. 60–61. ISBN 3806216126.
