= Schloss Arff =

German schloss

Coordinates: 51°03′04″N 06°48′57.50″E

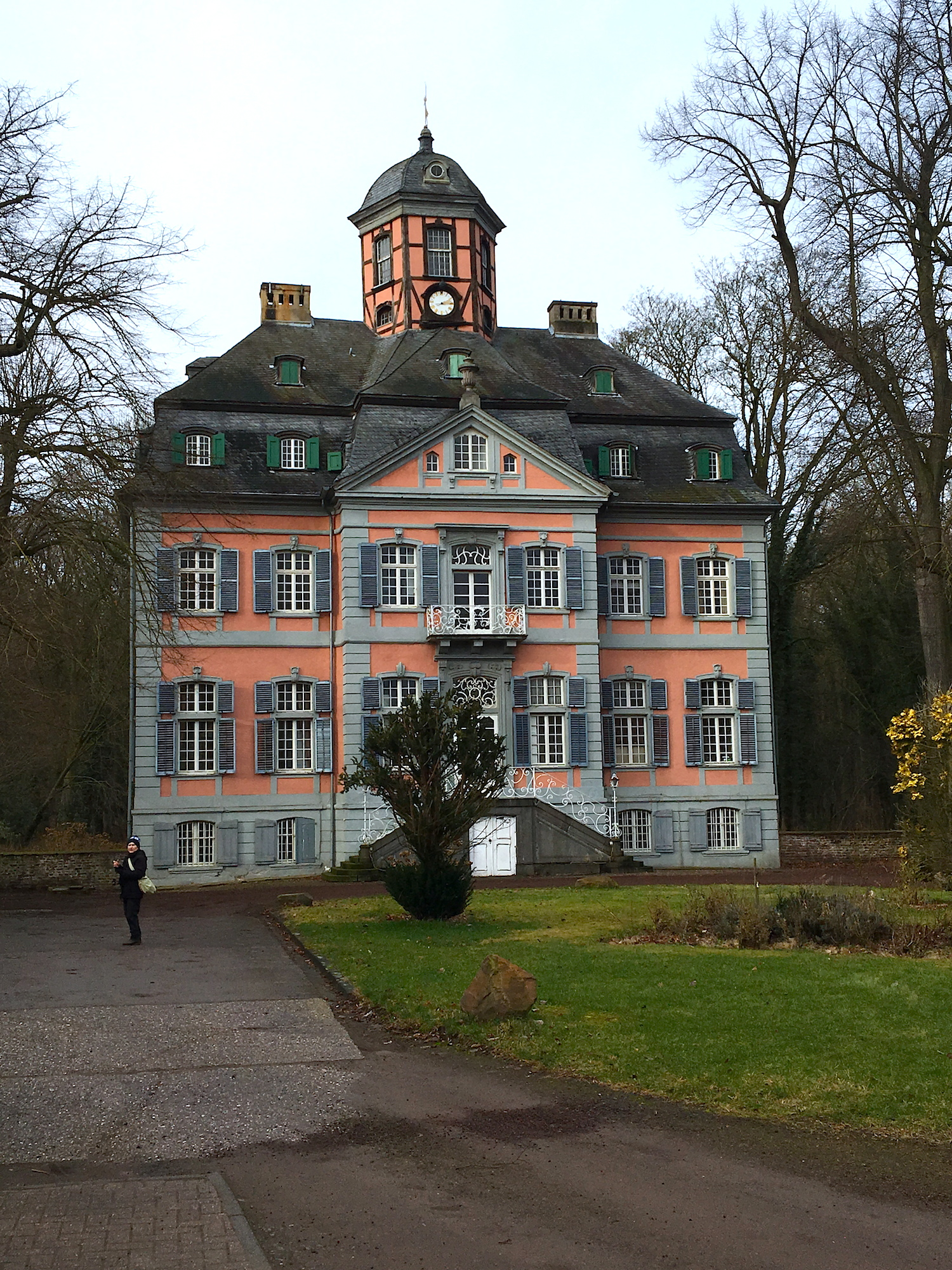
Schloss Arff

Schloss Arff is a former water castle in the locality of Roggendorf/Thenhoven which belongs to Cologne. It is located 20 km northwest of Cologne city centre and directly on the border with the city of Dormagen in the Rhine district of Neuss.

== History ==
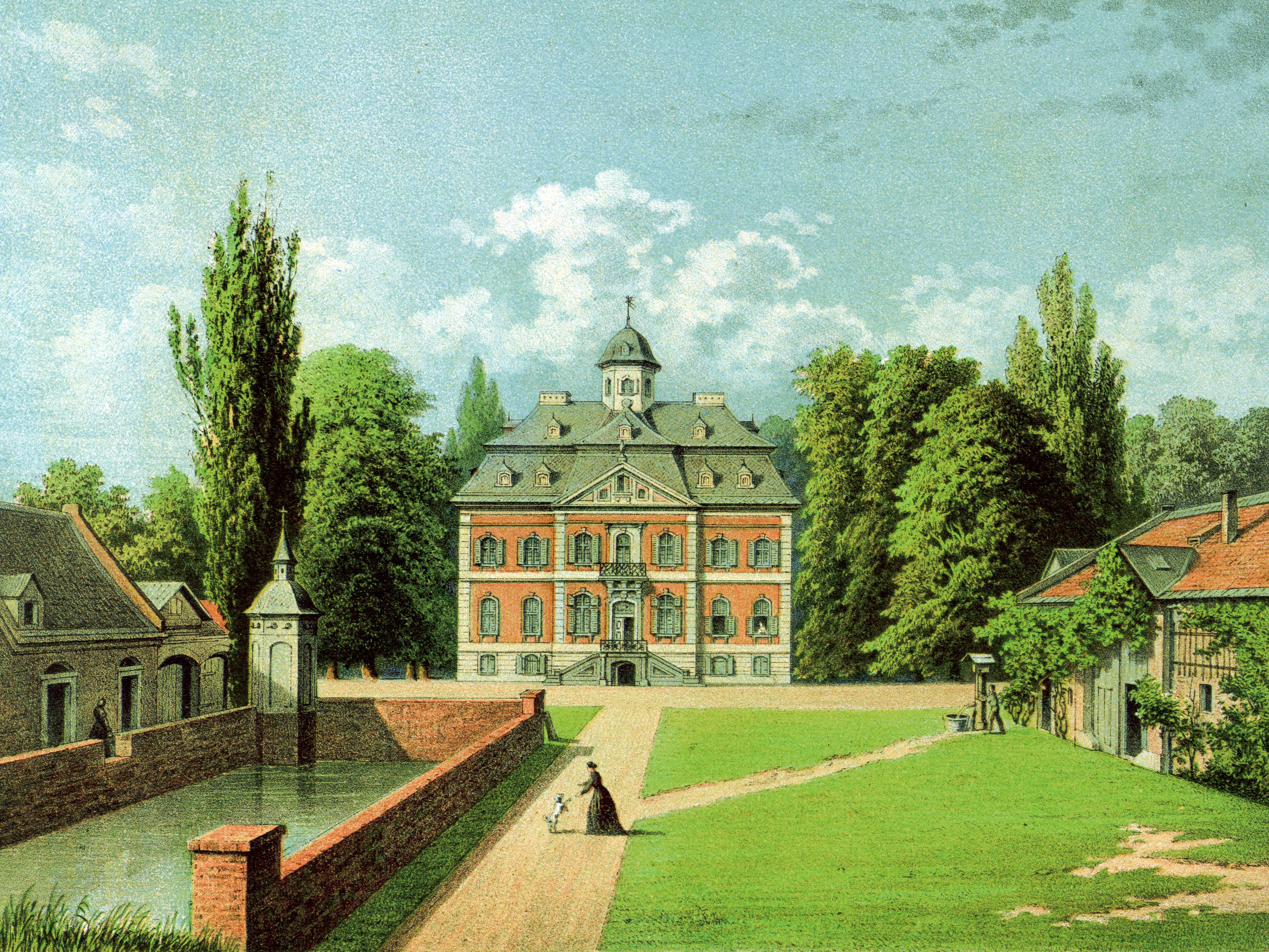
Schloss Arff ca. 1860, Alexander Duncker's collection

A first documentary mention of the Knights van der Arffe, the namesake of the castle, occurred in 1366. Albrecht von Baexen acquired the estate in 1572 through marriage to Catharina von der Arff. However, in the Cologne War from 1583 to 1586, the previous building was destroyed.

In 1750, Adam von Blittersdorf sold the estate to the von Buschmann family, who then arranged for the construction of the present castle within five years from 1750 to 1755. The architect was most likely the Frenchman Michael Leveilly. In 1803, the castle came to the von Geyr zu Schweppenburg family.

After the death of Christoph Freiherr von Geyr zu Schweppenburg, his heirs sold the castle in 2015 to his niece Caroline and her husband Friedhelm von Landsberg-Velen, who also run the leisure park around Schloss Dankern. Since then, SchlossArff has been used for weddings and other events. In 2019, the castle was the filming location for the television film Louis van Beethoven.

== Facility ==
Main building and outer bailey as well as two parallel farm buildings and the manor house form the building parts and enclose the castle courtyard. The two-part garden complex was once surrounded by a moat. However, the feeding springs have dried up. It is a so-called Lustschloss (Maison de Plaisance) in which the nobility spent the summer months in the countryside, away from the cities.

== Appreciation ==
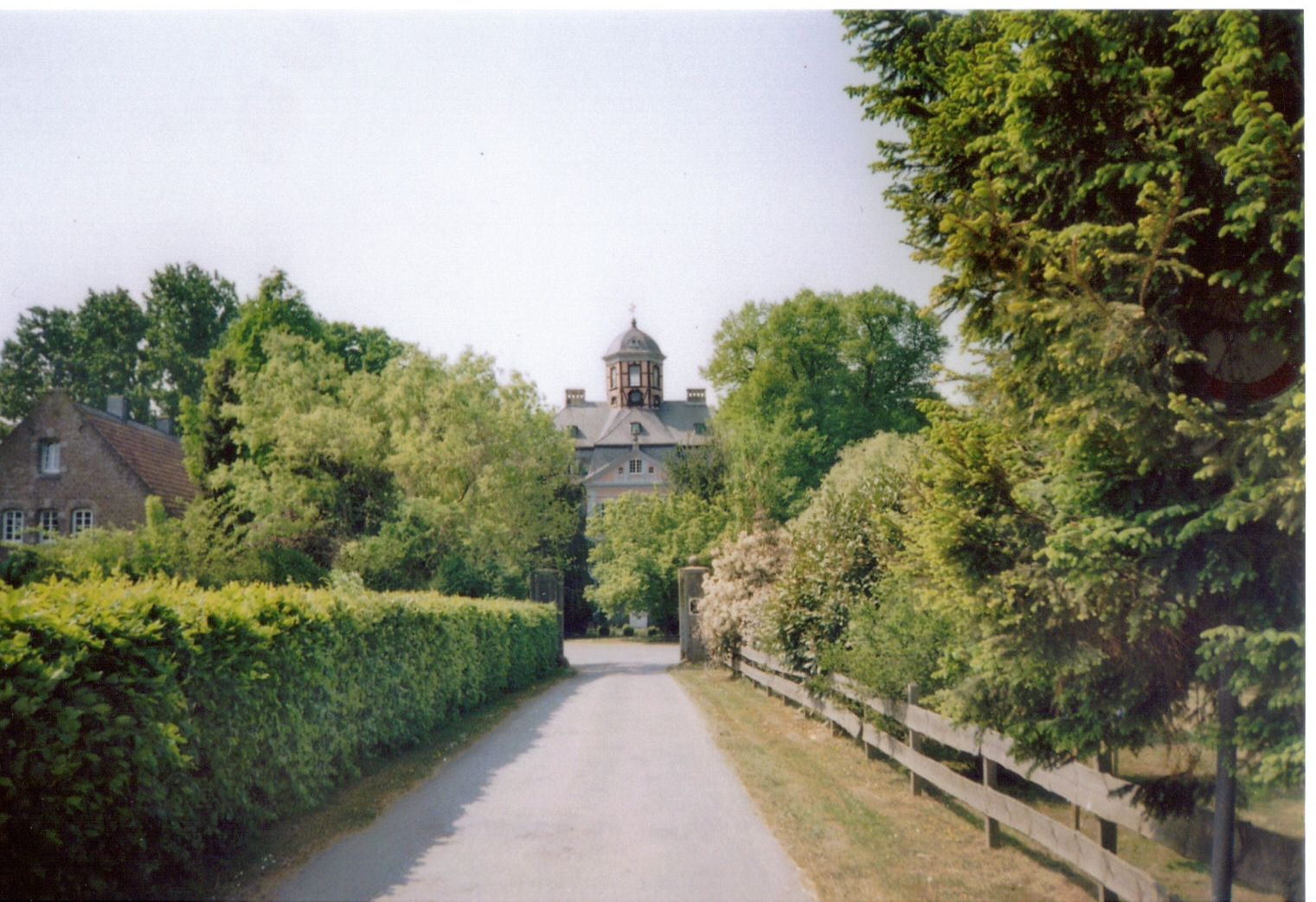
Entry

The mansion is attributed to the architect Michael Leveilly and is a simplified replica of Augustusburg and Falkenlust Palaces, Brühl, which is part of the World Heritage Site "Augustusburg Brühl" and where Leveilly was construction manager under François de Cuvilliés. Leveilly also designed the Haus Horr in Grevenbroich in Rhein-Kreis Neuss and the historic Rathaus of the city of Bonn.
