= Schloss Türnich =

German palace

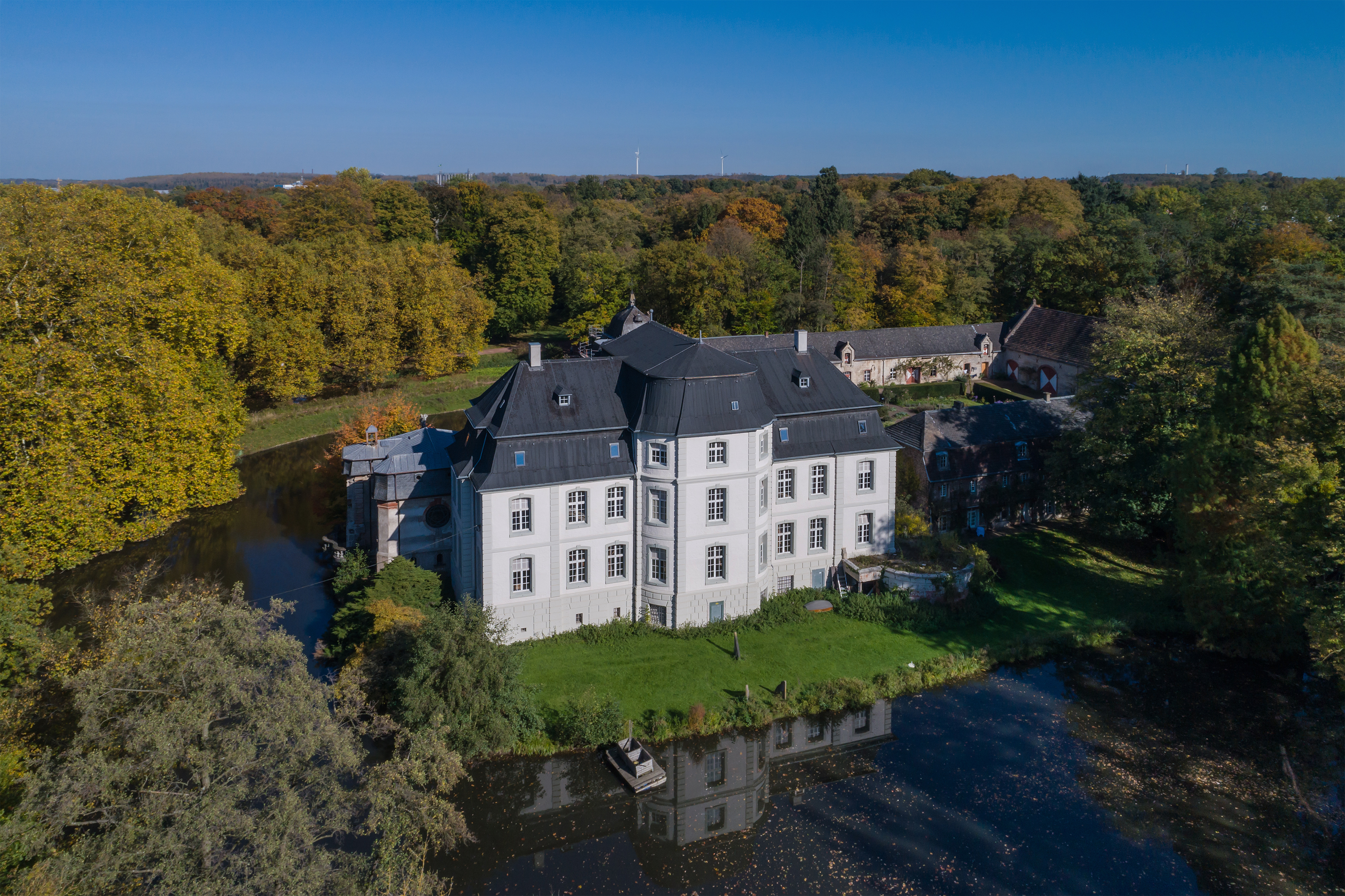

General information
- Location: Türnich, North Rhine-Westphalia, Germany
- Coordinates: 50°51′50″N 6°44′25″E
- Owner: Hoensbroich family

Website
- www.schloss-tuernich.de

Schloss Türnich is a schloss located in Türnich, now part of Kerpen, North Rhine-Westphalia, Germany. The present main building was built from 1757 to 1766 in Baroque style, with an adjacent English landscape park. It has belonged to the Hoensbroech family since 1850. A richly decorated chapel was added in 1895.

The building was closed in 1979 because of structural damage caused by groundwater-related subsidence and has since then been restored. Its spacious park with a cafe is open to the public.

== History ==
Türnich had a medieval moated castle, mentioned in 898. It was one of a chain of castles in the border region between the Duchy of Jülich and the Electorate of Cologne. It was first a possession of Essen Abbey but then became a possession of the Duke of Jülich, who lent it to House of Haas. Possession of the castle then passed into the joint custody of the Houses of Pallandt and Rolshausen until the latter became the castle's sole owners in 1707.

In 1757, Carl Ludwig Anton von Rolshausen began the construction of a new, Baroque schloss, probably designed by Michael Leveilly, then the French court architect of the Electorate of Cologne. It was completed in 1766. It was augmented in the 1790s by an English landscape garden. Georg-Karl von Rolshausen sold the manor house to Reichsgraf Karl Eugen von und zu Hoensbroech in 1850. The Hoensbroech family expanded schloss and garden by a gatehouse and a chapel.

Open-cast brown-coal mining in the region was expanded around 1890, and the Hoensbroichs participated in the business, making the erection of a chapel possible. However, from the 1950s it has significantly lowered the levels of groundwater around the mansion which caused substantial damage to the buildings. In 1979, the family, then headed by Count Godehard von und zu Hoensbroech, had to leave the house for safety. With help of the government of North Rhine-Westphalia, the town of Kerpen and Deutsche Stiftung Denkmalschutz, restoration began in 2009. The Hoensbroech family is considering a move back.

The farmland of the property is used for organic farming. The schloss features a cafe offering organic products.

== Architecture ==
The main building is a typical maison de plaisance (Lustschloss). The design is reminiscent of Schloss Jägerhof in Düsseldorf as well as to Falkenlust Palace in Brühl, designed by François de Cuvilliés.

=== Chapel ===
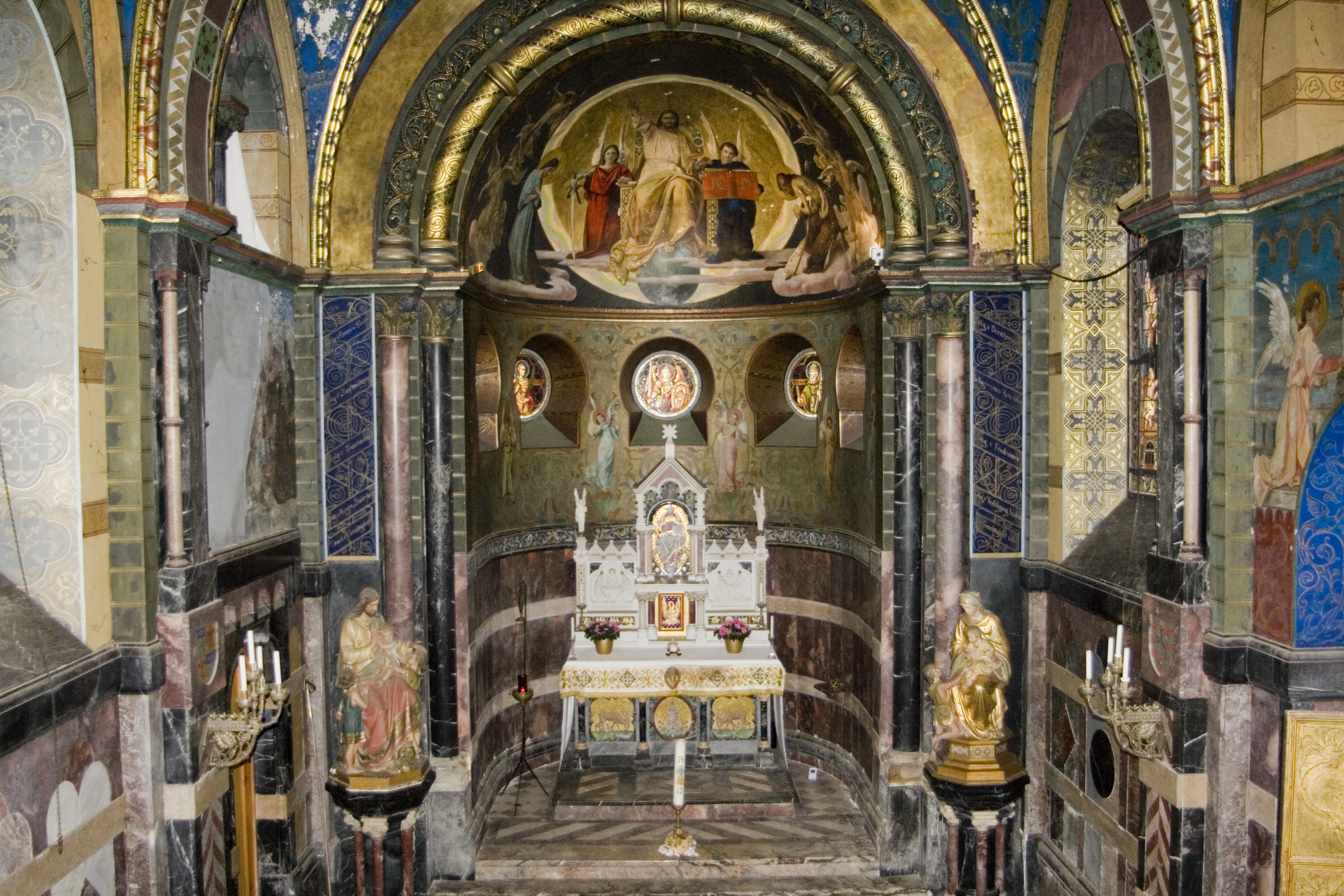
Interior of the chapel

The Neo-Romanesque chapel was constructed in 1895, replacing a simple older structure. It was built by Franz-Eugen von Hoensbroech as a memorial for his wife Hermenegilde, née Gräfin Wolff-Metternich zu Gracht, who had died young from tuberculosis. He commissioned Heinrich Krings to design the chapel. The chapel is dedicated to St. Elisabeth, who was a popular patron saint for Christian nobility who felt obliged to perform charitable acts for the public good. The family also claims descendency of Elisabeth.

The architect kept the facade neo-Baroque, matching the main building, but based the interior on Romanesque models, with rich decorations. Almost 90 different kinds of marble were used for floor and walls. The altar was built from Carrara marble, porphyr, onyx and alabaster. Paintings for walls and ceilings were created by Franz Guillery, mosaics by the Cologne workshop Peter Bayer, and furnishings were designed by the sculptor Wilhelm Albermann and the goldsmith Gabriel Hermeling. The ceiling of the apse shows Jesus enthroned, with Maria and Johannes. A rose window to the west represents Elisabeth's most famous miracle, the Miracle of the roses.

== Park ==
The mansion is surrounded by the Schlosspark Türnich, which is freely open to the public.

== Bibliography ==
- Heinz Firmenich, Helmut Rossen: Schloss Türnich. Gesellschaft für Buchdruckerei, Neuss 1975 (Rheinische Kunststätten. Nr. 175).
- Gemeinde Türnich: Türnich im Wandel der Zeit. Türnich 1974, pp. 175–179, 228.
- Harald Herzog: Rheinische Schloßbauten im 19. Jahrhundert. Bonn 1981, ISBN 3-7927-0585-0, pp. 29 ff, 164–172.
- Sabine Heuser-Hauck: Der Architekt Heinrich Krings (1875–1925). Dissertation an der Philosophischen Fakultät Bonn, Bonn 2005, pp. 180–184.
- Norbert Hierl-Deronco: Es ist eine Lust zu bauen. Von Bauherren, Bauleuten und vom Bauen im Barock in Kurbayern-Franken-Rheinland. Eigenverlag, Krailling 2001, ISBN 3-929884-08-9.
- Hermann Hinz: Archäologische Funde und Denkmäler des Rheinlandes, Band 2. Kreis Bergheim, Düsseldorf 1969, pp. 344–345.
- Frank Kretzschmar (ed.): Kirchen Klöster und Kapellen im Erftkreis. Rheinland-Verlag, Köln [1984], ISBN 3-7927-0821-3, pp. 134–137 (Erftkreisveröffentlichung. Nr. 94).
- Henriette Meynen: Wasserburgen Schösser und Landsitze im Erftkreis. Köln 1979, ISBN 3-7927-0521-4, pp. 104–109.
- Annaliese Ohm: Die Denkmäler des Rheinlandes. Königshoven-Türnich. Rheinland-Verlag, Düsseldorf 1971, ISBN 3-508-00186-5, pp. 97–99, 103–104.
