= Van Hoensbroeck =

- noble family
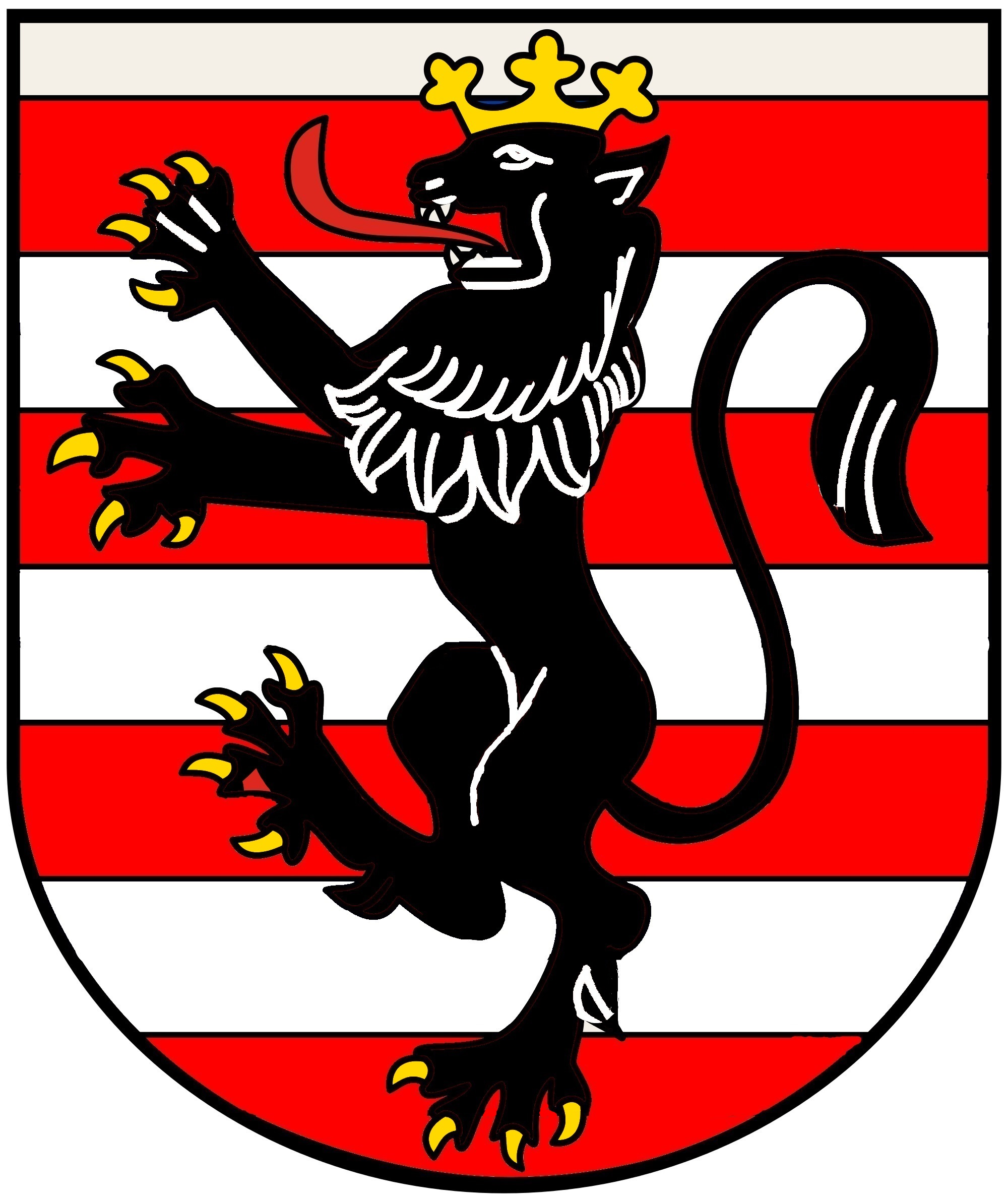
- Country: Netherlands; Germany
- Founded: 14th century
- Founder: Nicolaes Hoen
- Current head: Edmund Pocius, Marquess and Count van Hoensbroeck
- Titles: marquess, count, baron, etc.

The House of Hoensbroeck (in German: Hoensbroech) is an old European aristocratic family with medieval origins in the town of Hoensbroek near Heerlen in Limburg, Netherlands. The family is part of Dutch and German nobility.

== History ==
Nicolaes Hoen is the first known ancestor of the family; he was killed in the Battle of Baesweiler in 1371. During many centuries, the family owned and lived in Hoensbroek Castle, which can still be visited today. They played an important social and political role in the region.

In the Netherlands a comital cadet branch survives. In Germany, the elder line of the family continues to thrive as Marquis (Marquess, from the Spanish Netherlands, for the family's head) and Reichsgraf[in] (Count[ess], for each member of the family) von und zu Hoensbroech.

== Gallery ==
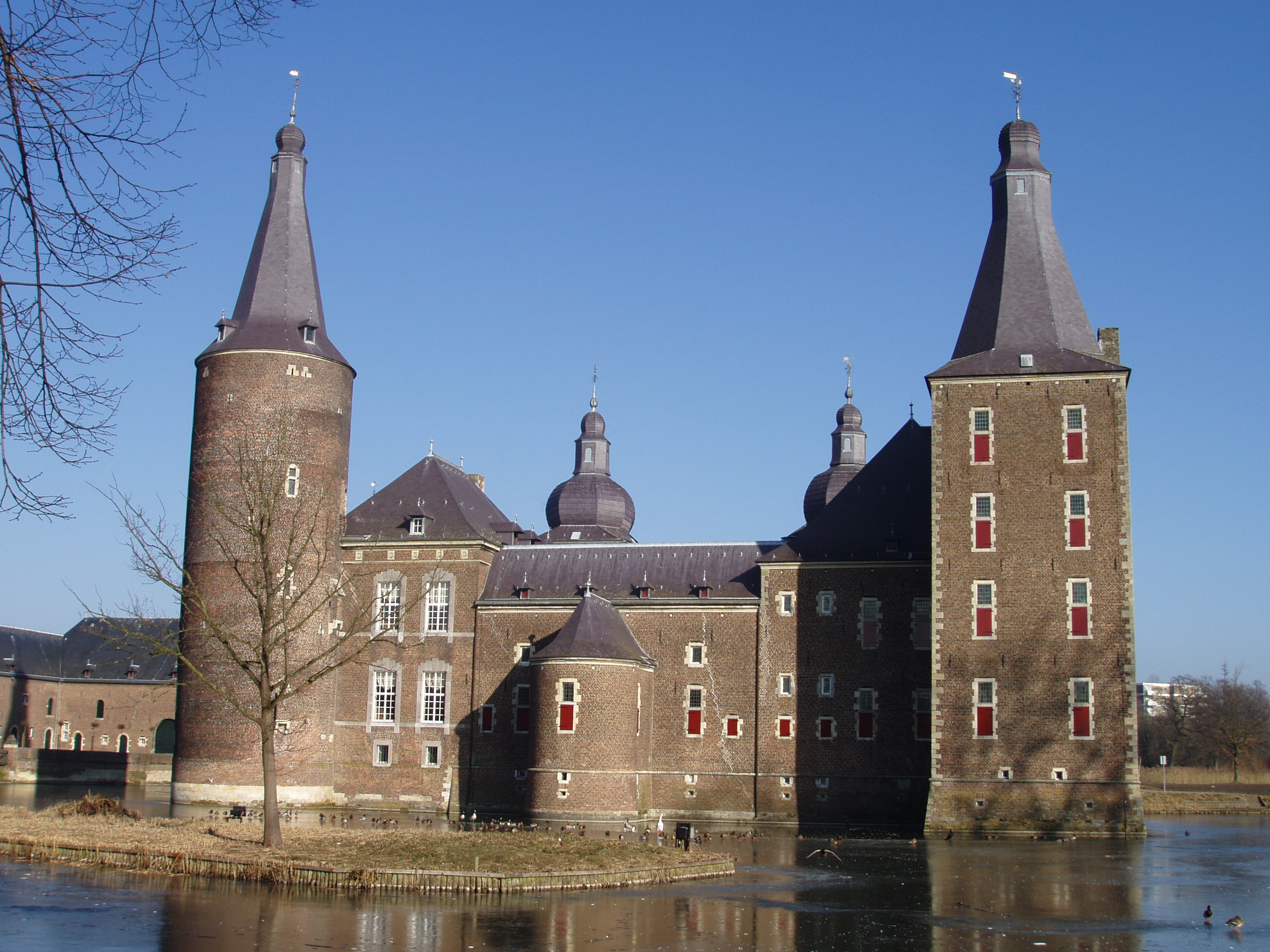
Hoensbroek Castle

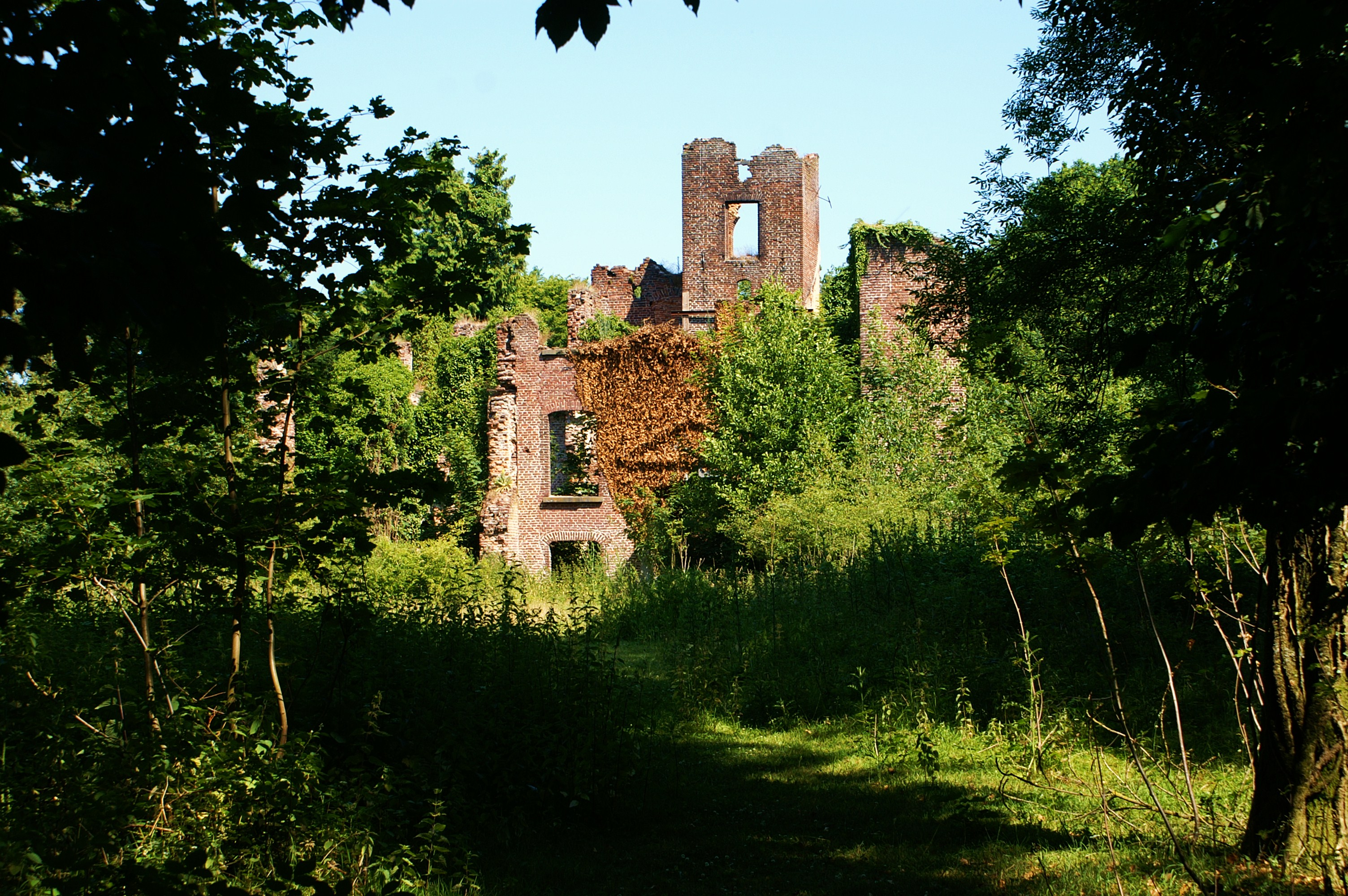
Kasteel Bleijenbeek

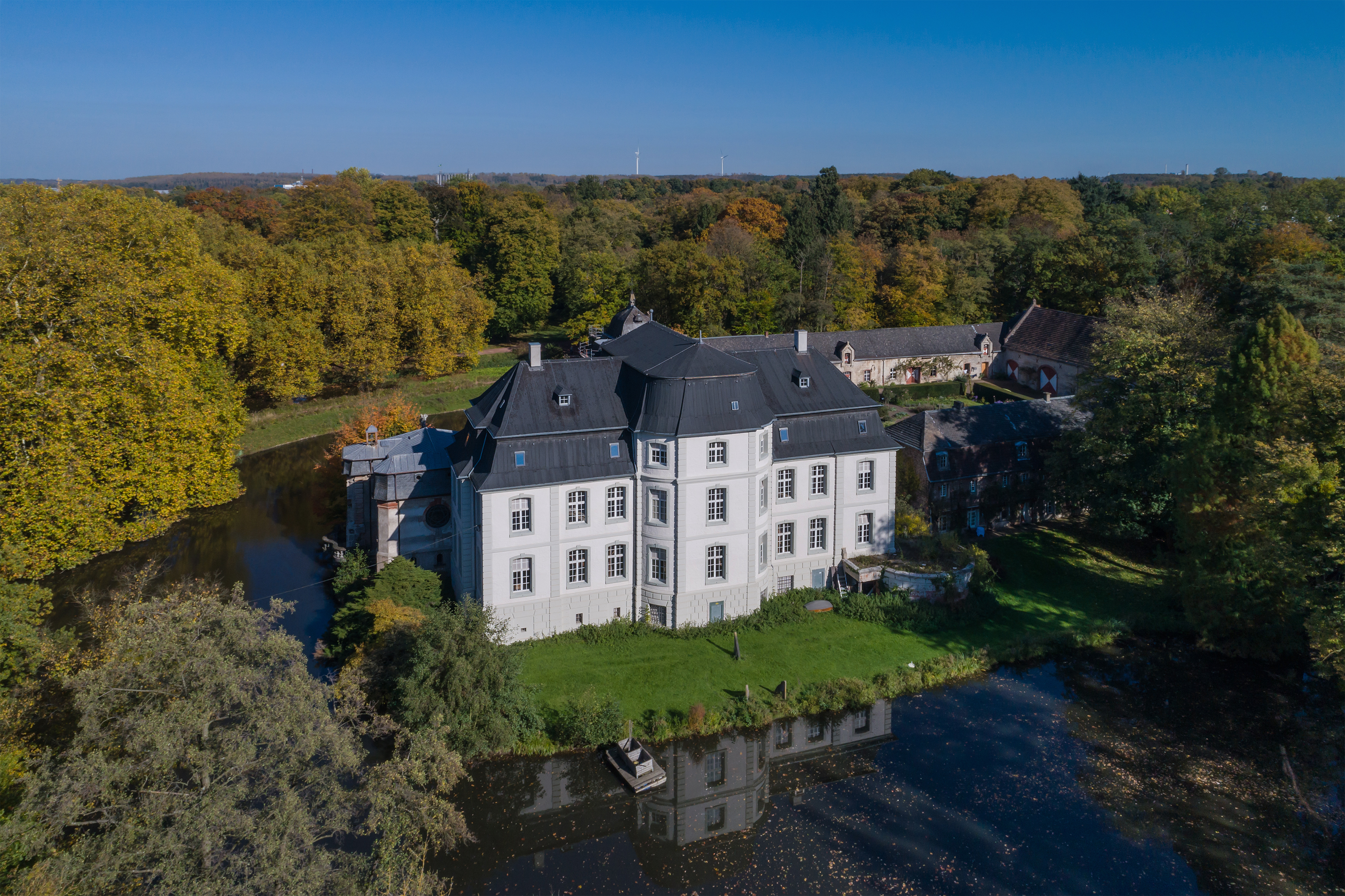
Schloss Türnich

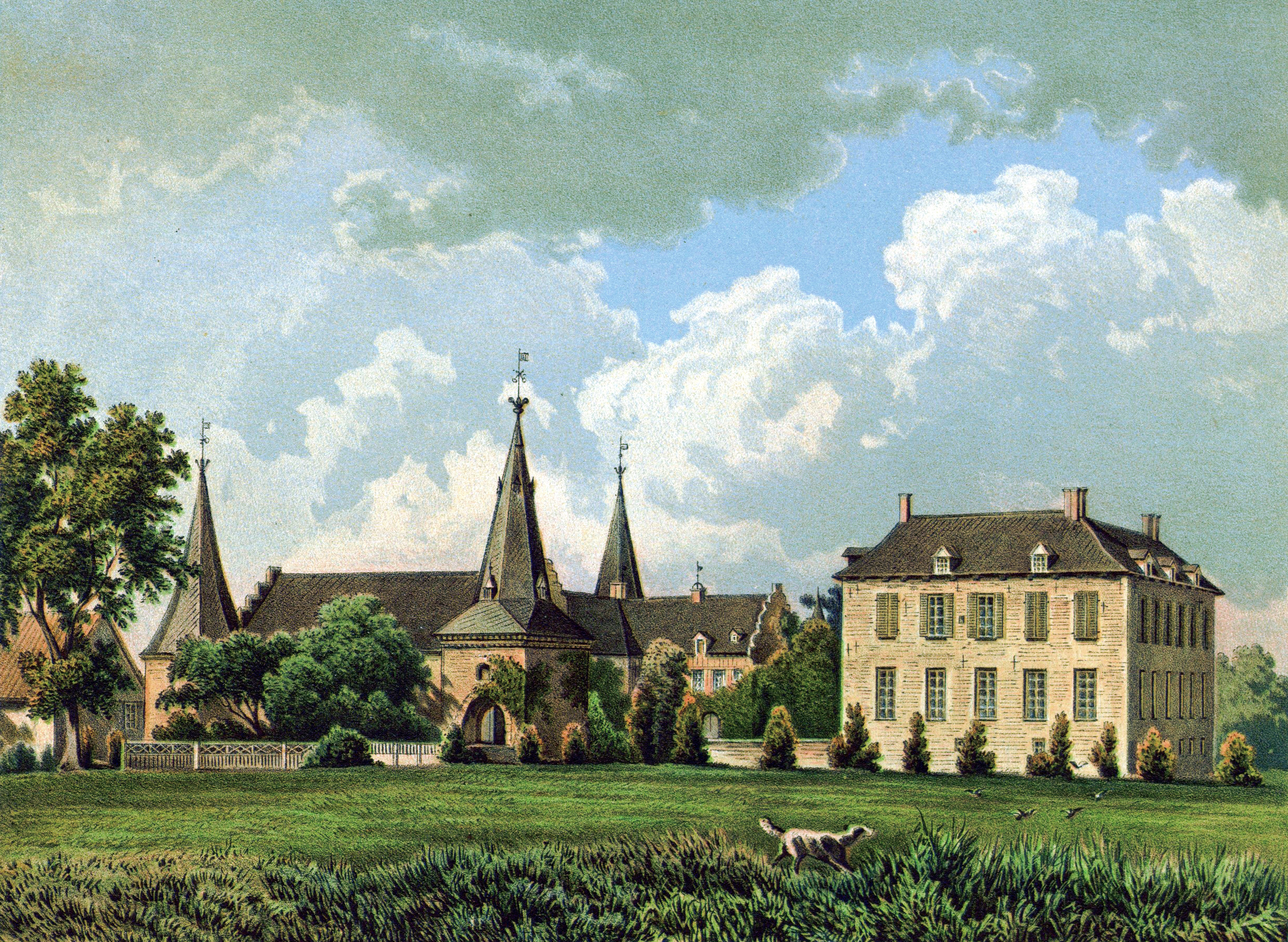
Schloss Haag in Geldern

== Literature ==
- Hupp, Otto (1930). "Regensburg 1930". Münchener Kalender (in German). Munich: G.J. Manz. ASIN B00C7E8TBE. OCLC 1065103385.
- Venne, J. M. van de; Win, J. Th H. de; Peeters, P. A. H. M. (1967). Geschiedenis van Hoensbroek (in Dutch). Hoensbroek: Gemeentebestuur van Hoensbroek. OCLC 214305323.
- Nederland's Adelsboek (in Dutch) (JGR 85 ed.). 's-Gravenhage: Centraal Bureau voor Genealogie. 1996. pp. 186–199. ISBN 90-70324-82-2. OCLC 1040062671.
