= Michael Leveilly =

18th-century French architect

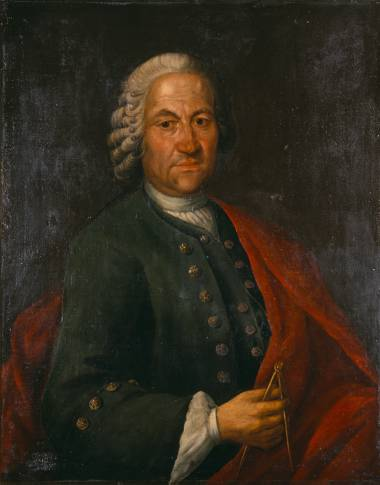
Michael Leveilly by François Rousseau, c. 1750

Michael Leveilly (also Michel Leveilly, Michael Leveillé; 1694 – 23 January 1762) was a French architect who was active essentially in Germany.

== Life ==
Leveilly was probably a pupil of François Blondel or of Robert de Cotte. In 1717, at the behest of Elector Joseph Clemens of Bavaria, he came to Bonn as an architectural and decorative draftsman to help realize the buildings designed by the Parisian court architect Robert de Cotte.

In 1722, he then moved to Bonn entirely. After the death of the Elector in 1723, he was taken into the service of the succeeding Elector Clemens August of Bavaria. In 1728, Leveilly was appointed sub-architect and was also responsible for the gardens, then in 1733 he became senior architect. There, Leveilly was mainly active as executive architect, realizing the plans of François de Cuvilliés, but also contributing and implementing his own ideas, especially for the interior finishes. In addition to his work as court architect, he also worked for the city of Bonn, whose Old City Hall he planned and built.

On 10 February 1722, he married Anna Maria Seron (1700–1741) in St. Remigius. The couple had nine sons and six daughters. In his second marriage, Leveilly took on 5 December 1743 in the Bonn parish church St. Gangolf Agnes Gladbach to wife.

Leveilly died in Bonn aged about 67.

== Work ==
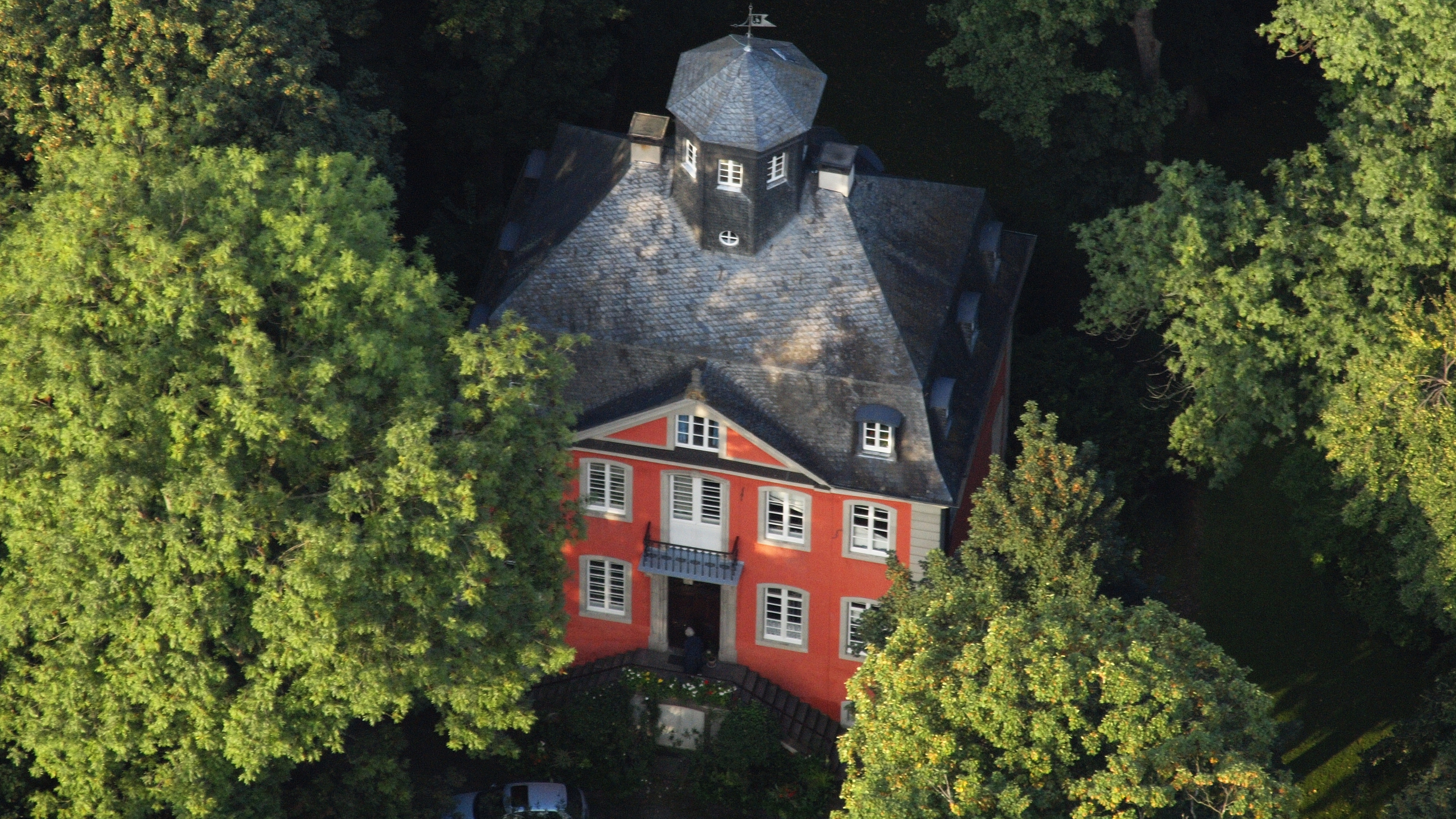
Graurheindorfer Burg

- Augustusburg and Falkenlust Palaces, Brühl
- Altes Rathaus Bonn
- Burg Graurheindorf
- Schloss Arff
- Electoral Palace, Bonn
- Priesterseminar Köln (destructed in 1864)
- Gatehouse of the Poppelsdorf Palace
- Plettenberger Hof (Construction direction from 1729 to 1733)
- Schloss Türnich, Kerpen
- (attribution) Reconstruction and extension of the Sternenburg in Poppelsdorf, c. 1737 (demolished in 1908)
