= Altes Rathaus (Bonn) =

Former German town hall

Coordinates: 50°44′6.13″N 7°6′10.57″E

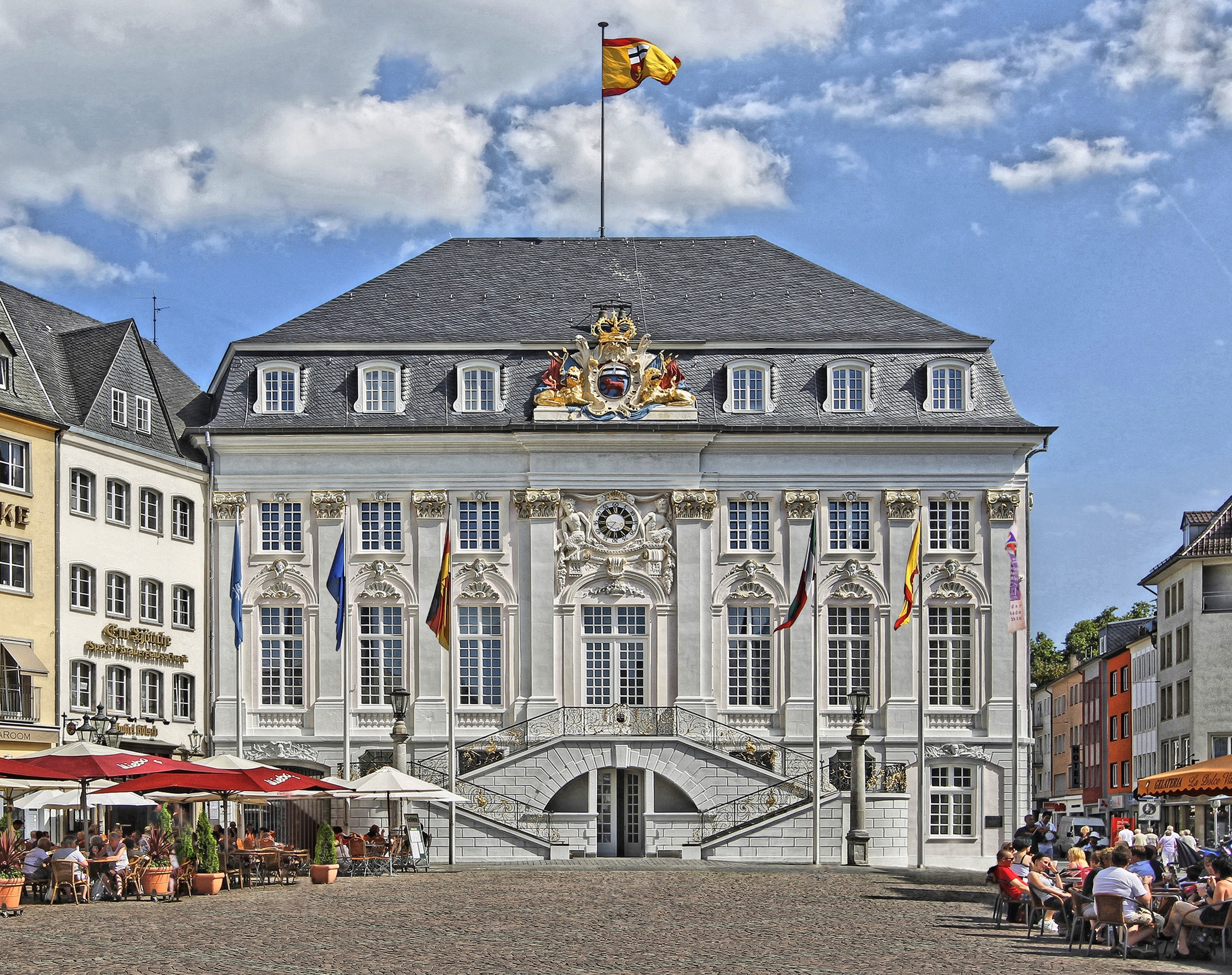
Altes Rathaus (2011) after the rehabilitation

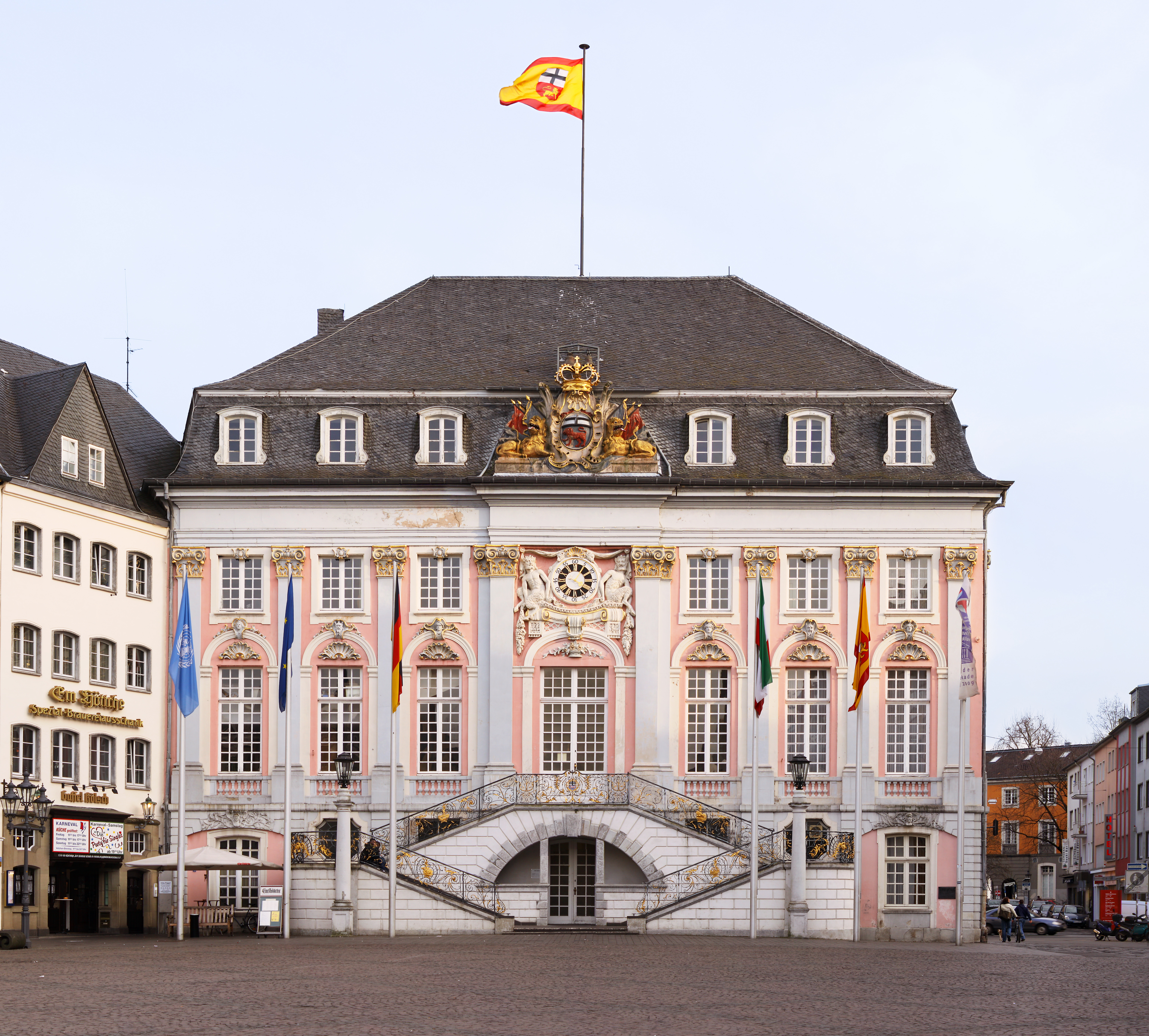
Altes Rathaus before the rehabilitation (2009)

The Altes Rathaus at Bonner Marktplatz was built between 1737 and 1738 in the Rococo style by the electoral court architect Michael Leveilly; however, it was not completely finished until around 1780. The four-storey building has seven window axes and a gambrel with dormers. It stands as a Baudenkmal under Cultural heritage management.

Apart from its central location in the Bonn-Zentrum and its former function as the seat of the municipal administration, the town hall has also become famous for the gilded perron on the market square. In the course of history, this has repeatedly been the scene of important events, with famous personalities appearing there before the people of Bonn.

== History ==
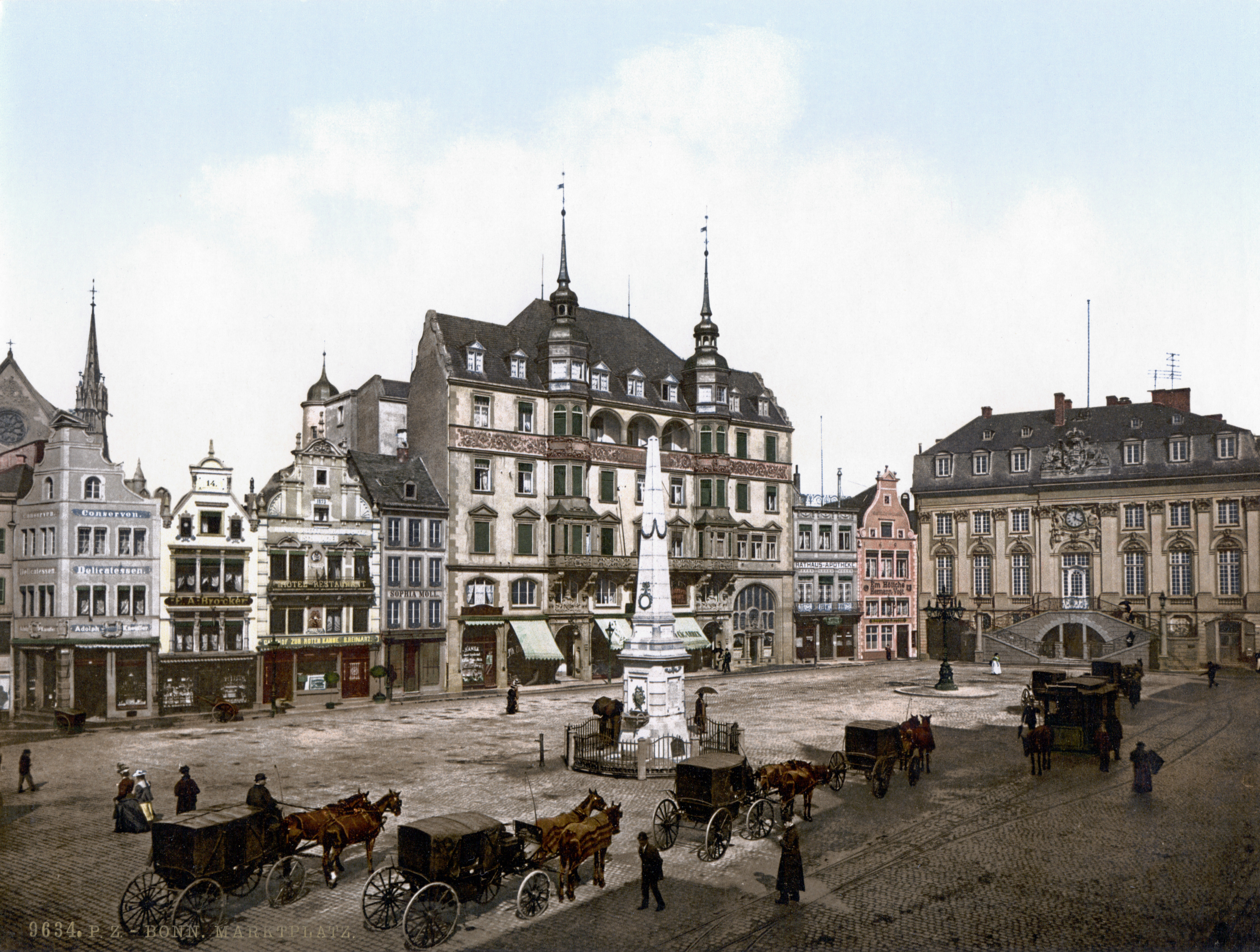
Marktplatz with old Rathaus (right), photochrom around 1900

The building was erected to the former town hall, which had been destroyed by artillery fire during the Siege of Bonn (1689) and subsequently only makeshiftly restored, a three-storey building presumably erected in the 15th century. After a design by the master builder Nikolaus Krakamp for a new town hall had been rejected, court architect Leveilly came into play, whose design was available in autumn 1736 After his approval, Elector Clemens August of Bavaria laid the foundation stone for the new building on 24 April 1737, which was topping out on 5 November 1737 and could be occupied the following October; the first joint meeting of the Stadtmagistrat, mayor, lawyers and council took place here on 29 October 1738. The railing of the outside staircase was not made until 1765 and finally around 1780, the plastering and the facade decoration of the town hall was completed. Also in 1780, the municipal meat hall, a three-aisled building with square pillars, was built as an extension to the town hall on its former rear side facing Rathausgasse according to plans by the court architect Johann Heinrich Roth. In the 1870s, this building, eventually used by the city treasury and the city archives, was rebuilt in simple forms.

On 18 October 1944, the town hall burnt down to the perimeter walls during the Allied bombing raids of the Second World War, and part of the vaults in the basement were also impacted. The subsequent reconstruction was carried out without the previous stucco decorations and with a higher roof until 1950. After Bonn became Federal Capital in 1949, it became the site of historic speeches and state visits. As early as 12 September 1949, Theodor Heuss appeared there before the people of Bonn to celebrate his just-won election as Federal President. In 1962, the French President Charles de Gaulle and in 1963, US President John F. Kennedy made welcoming speeches. On 13 June 1989, the people of Bonn cheered the Soviet head of state and party leader Mikhail Gorbachev there. All heads of state signed the Golden Book of the city of Bonn.

On 10 April 1973, Bonn's City Hall was opened to the public on the occasion of a state visit by the South Vietnamese general and president Nguyễn Văn Thiệu stormed by about 60 hooded members of the Communist Party of Germany, the League Against Imperialism and the Communist Party of Germany/Marxist-Leninist, windows and inventory were destroyed. About 2000 demonstrators formed a wall against the police. The action caused half a million Mark in property damage.

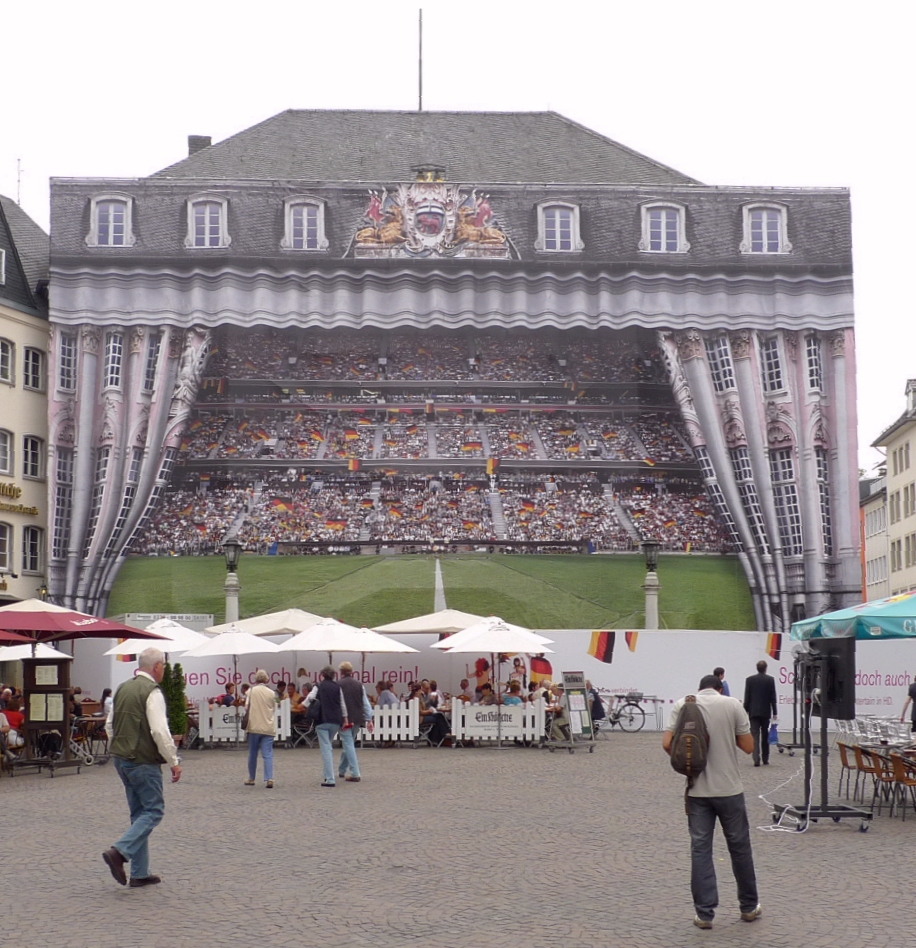
Rathausumhüllung während der Sanierung (June 2010)

The building on Marktplatz lost its function as the seat of the municipal administration in 1978, as capacity was no longer sufficient after the mergers completed in 1969 and a new Stadthaus had been built in Nordstadt. However, it continues to be used by the city of Bonn as a Representation Object. Important decisions and meetings that take place outside the activities of the committees and the city council continue to take place there. In addition, speeches and ceremonies of importance to the city continue to be held in the Old Town Hall. Within the framework of these tasks, the executive board department Basic Affairs and the executive board department International Affairs and Representation have their headquarters in the Old Town Hall, in addition to the Lord Mayor. The City of Bonn offers the possibility of getting married on selected dates in the wedding room of the City Hall.

=== Rehabilitation measures ===
The building had been in poor condition for several years, and the necessary renovation was postponed several times for financial reasons. The renovation of the façade, doors, windows and roof that was carried out, as well as the renewal of the technology (heating, air-conditioning and sanitary installations) and the improvement of fire protection cost 5.45 million euros and lasted from February 2010 to June 2011. The renovation was financed with funds from the so-called Konjunkturpaket. Since then, there has been further renovation and modernisation work, mainly carried out by the "Verein Altes Rathaus" founded in October 2009.

== Historical pictures ==
Historic pictures

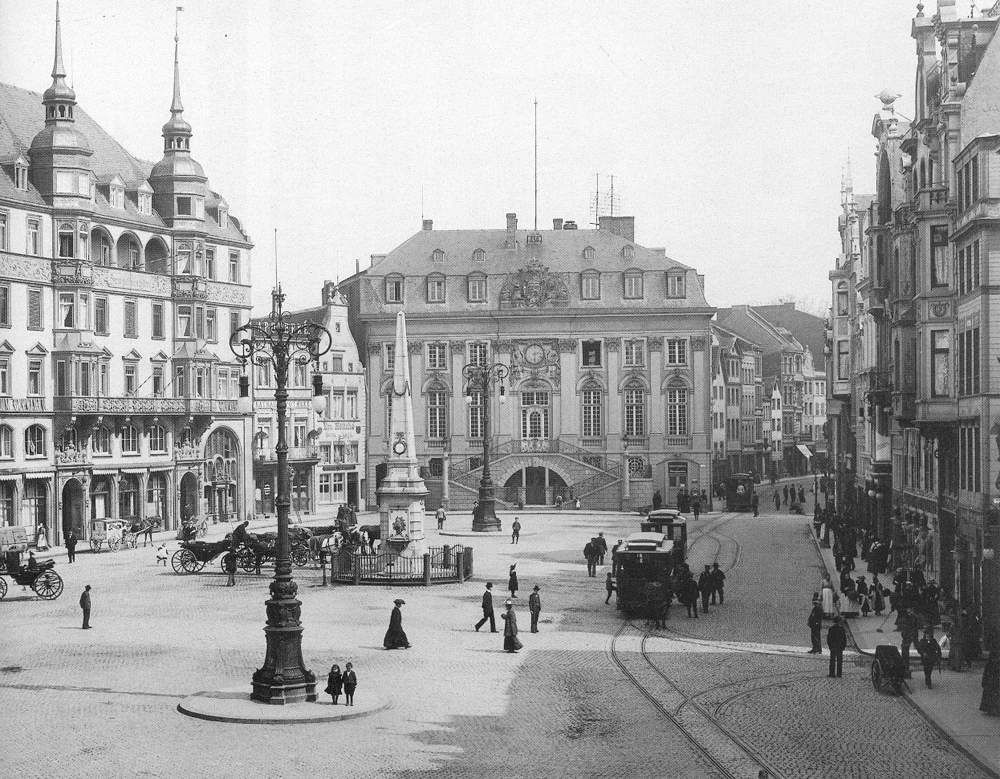
Altes Rathaus, 1904

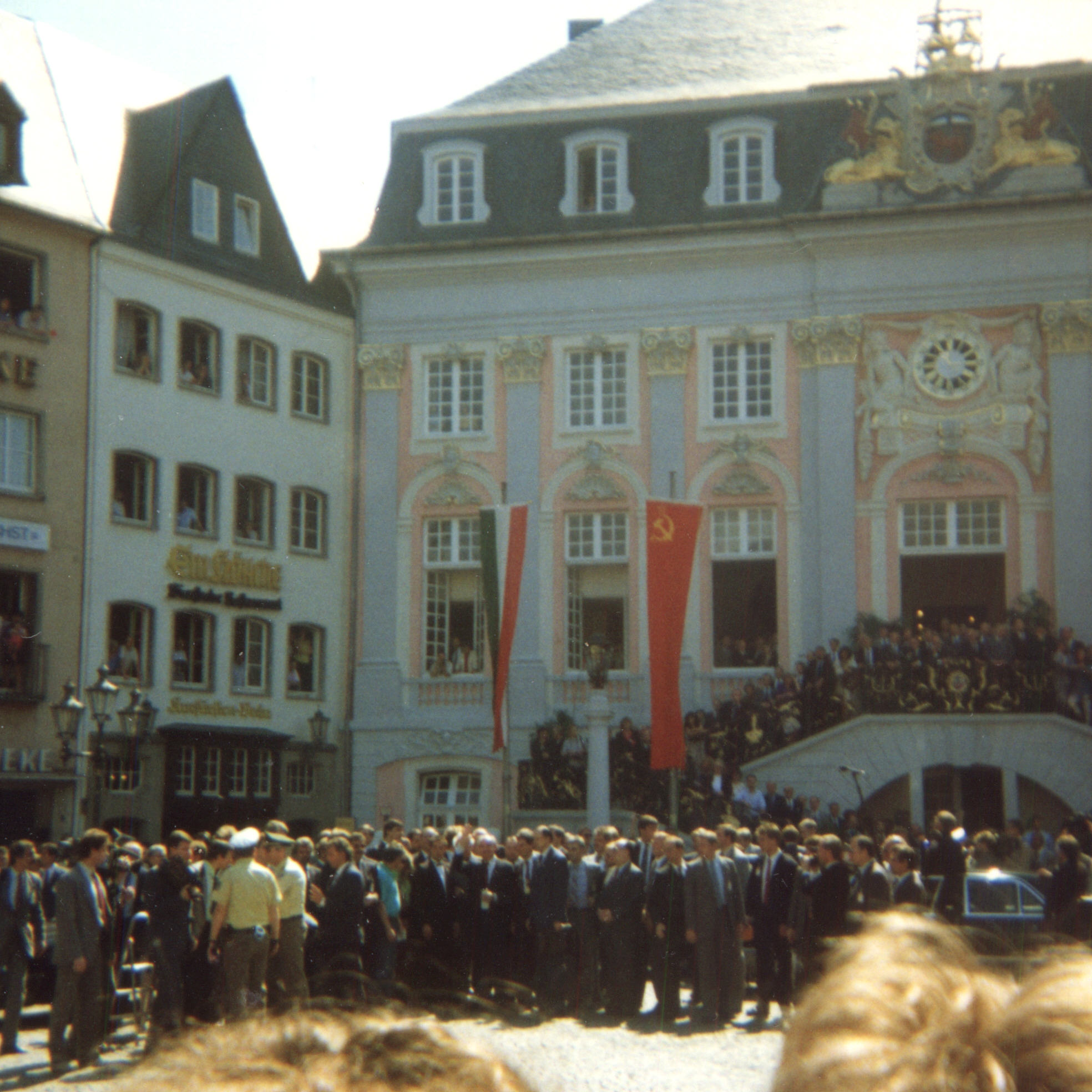
Michail Gorbatschow in front of the Alten Rathaus, 13 June 1989

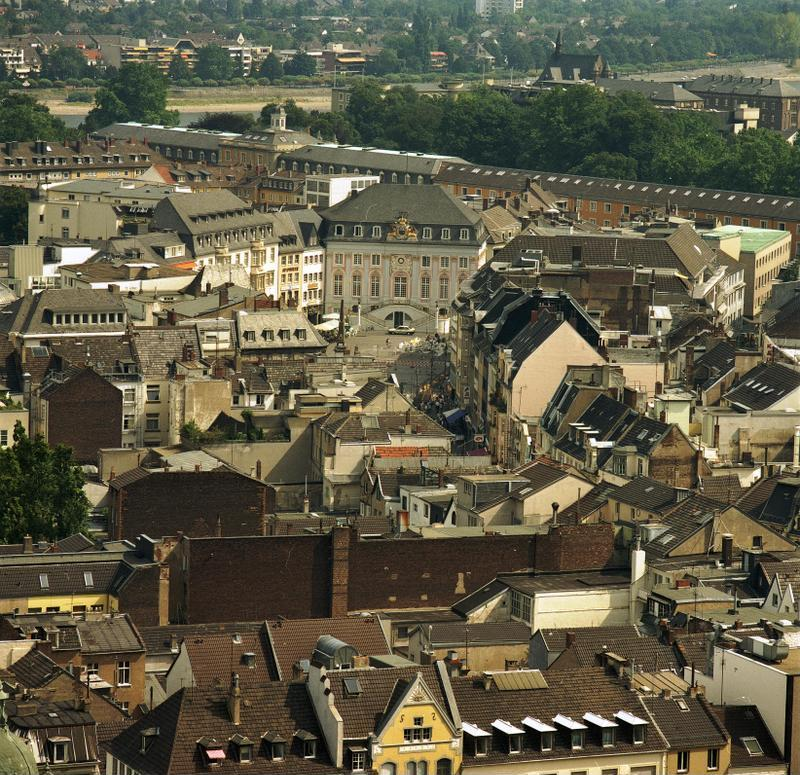
View of the Stadthaus from the Marktplatz and the Altes Rathaus, 1991

== Reception ==
- The town hall, though not an outstanding work of art, is nevertheless composed with great skill as the conclusion of the long narrow market, with the single large pilaster order and the broad sweeping flight of steps of significant effect.
- Impressively, the town hall with its balanced façade closes the market square. (...) Since the three-storey building occupies the entire narrow side of the square, its effect is further enhanced.
