= Haustein =

Haustein is a surname. Notable people with the surname include:

- Dennis Haustein (born 1990), German politician
- Gene Haustein (1907–1984), American racing driver
- Hans Haustein (1894–1933), German scientist
- Knut-Olaf Haustein (1934–2006), German physician

== See also ==
- Hastings
