= Hoensbroek Castle =

Castle in the Netherlands

- Hoensbroek, Limburg
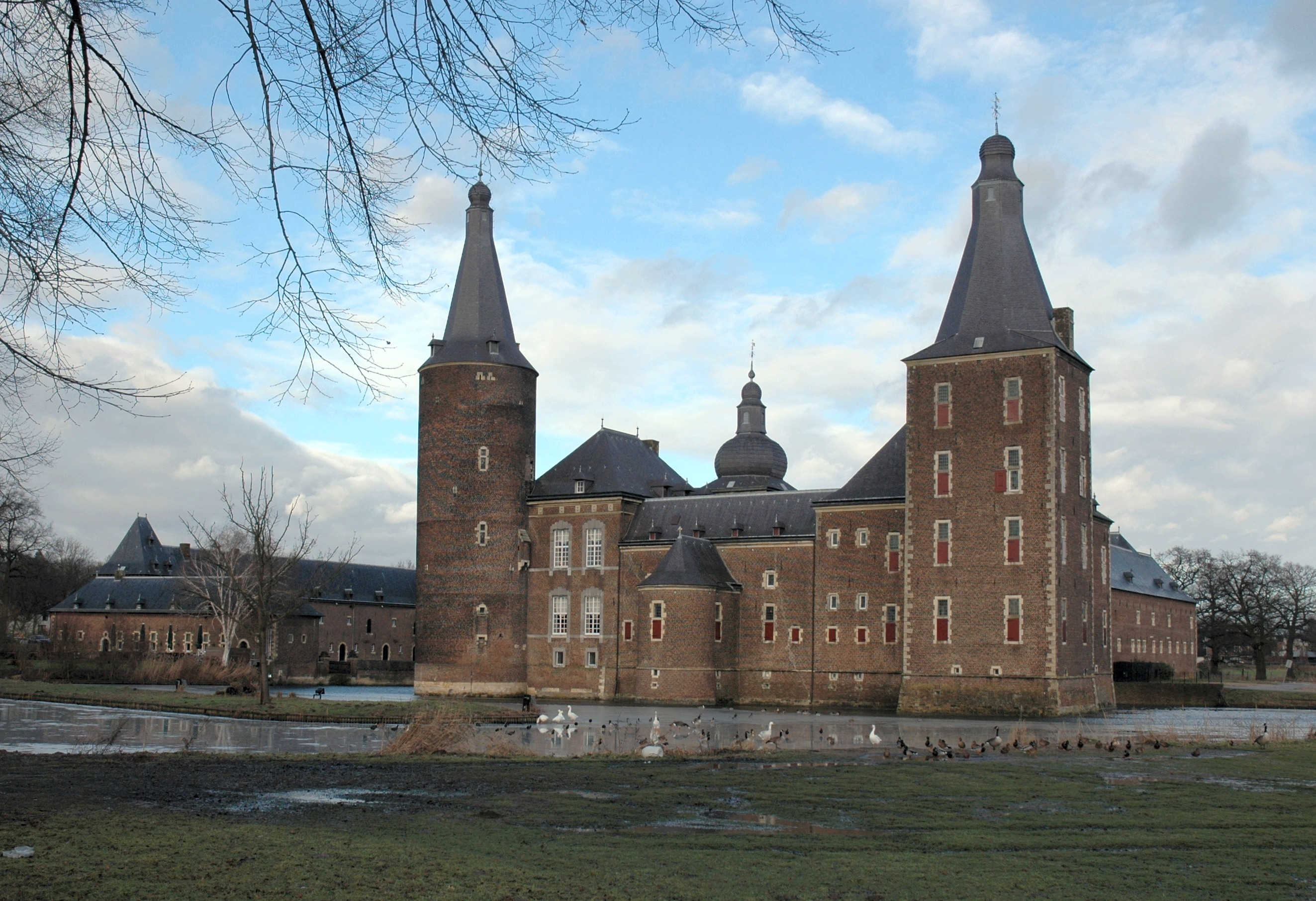
- Hoensbroek Castle

Site information
- Type: Castle

Location
- the Netherlands
- Coordinates: 50°55′01″N 5°55′05″E

Site history
- Built: 1360
- Built by: Herman Hoen; Lord of Hoensbroek

Hoensbroek Castle (Dutch: Kasteel Hoensbroek) or Gebrook Castle (Dutch: Gebrookhoes) is one of the largest castles in the Netherlands. It is situated in Hoensbroek, a town in the province of Limburg. This imposing watercastle is known as 'the most lordly stronghold between Rhine and Meuse'. The oldest part of the castle, notably the tall round tower, dates from around 1360, when it was built by Herman Hoen, though a predecessor to the castle had already existed in the swamp (or Gebrook) the castle was located in. This so-called motte-and-bailey dated from around 1225. In 1250 a fortified manor was built on the location of the present castle. Because of its important strategical location in the Duchy of Brabant, located along important trading routes to Maastricht, Aachen and Cologne, the castle was expanded in several phases, becoming the largest stronghold between the Meuse and the Rhine rivers. It contains at least 67 halls, rooms and living quarters.

== Founder and inhabitants ==
The first lord of Hoensbroek was Sir Herman Hoen, who gave the castle its name (Herhoensbroeck). He was a member of the family Hoen van den / tzo Broeck, later changed to Hoen van Hoensbroek and Van Hoensbroeck. The name eventually passed to the later settlement of Hoensbroek (nowadays part of the municipality of Heerlen). Sir Herman Hoen's father, Claes, died in 1371 at the Battle of Baesweiler. Because of his support in the struggle against the Duchies of Jülich and Guelders, Herman Hoen was awarded the lordship Gebrook, Gebroek, Ingenbrouck (Broek being an old Dutch word for swamp, morass) in 1388 by duchess Joanna of Brabant, the lands in question being separated from the territory of Heerlen.

The castle was the ancestral home of the knights Hoen van den Broeck, the Imperial baron Hoen van Hoensbroeck, and the Imperial counts and viscounts Van en tot Hoensbroeck for nearly six centuries. The family Van Hoensbroeck left the castle at the end of the 18th century, after which the castle entered a period of decay. Count Frans Lothar sold the castle in 1927 to the present day owners, the foundation 'Ave Rex Christe'. It was thoroughly restored between 1930 and 1940. During and shortly after the second world war, the castle and accompanying buildings were used for diverse ends. In 1945, the castle was used for war orphans, under the Carmelite Sisters. From 1951 to 1973 the writer-poet Bertus Aafjes lived in parts of the castle. In the period 1986–1989 another restoration took place. Since then it has formed a popular and educative museum destination, funded by the municipality.

== The complex ==
Over the centuries the castle has received extensive rebuilding and expansion three times. The different architectural styles from the different centuries (14th, 17th and 18th) are easy to separate from each other. The complex is surrounded by a moat and has four wings situated around a rectangular courtyard. The main building is reachable over a bridge. The main building has two identical square towers with union-tops, flanking the entrance, and two taller half-separate corner towers of irregular shape at the backside. The forecastles are both U-formed and enclose two large inner courts.

From 1720 to 1722, Frans Arnold, Imperial count van Hoensbroek, had substantial reworking done, including the building of a new north-western wing. The interior, with its illusionistic ceiling paintings from the 18th century, shows French influence. The son of Frans Arnold, Lotharius Frans, was the last lord of Hoensbroeck (1759–1794) who resided in the castle, until 1787, just before the French Revolution.

== Gallery ==
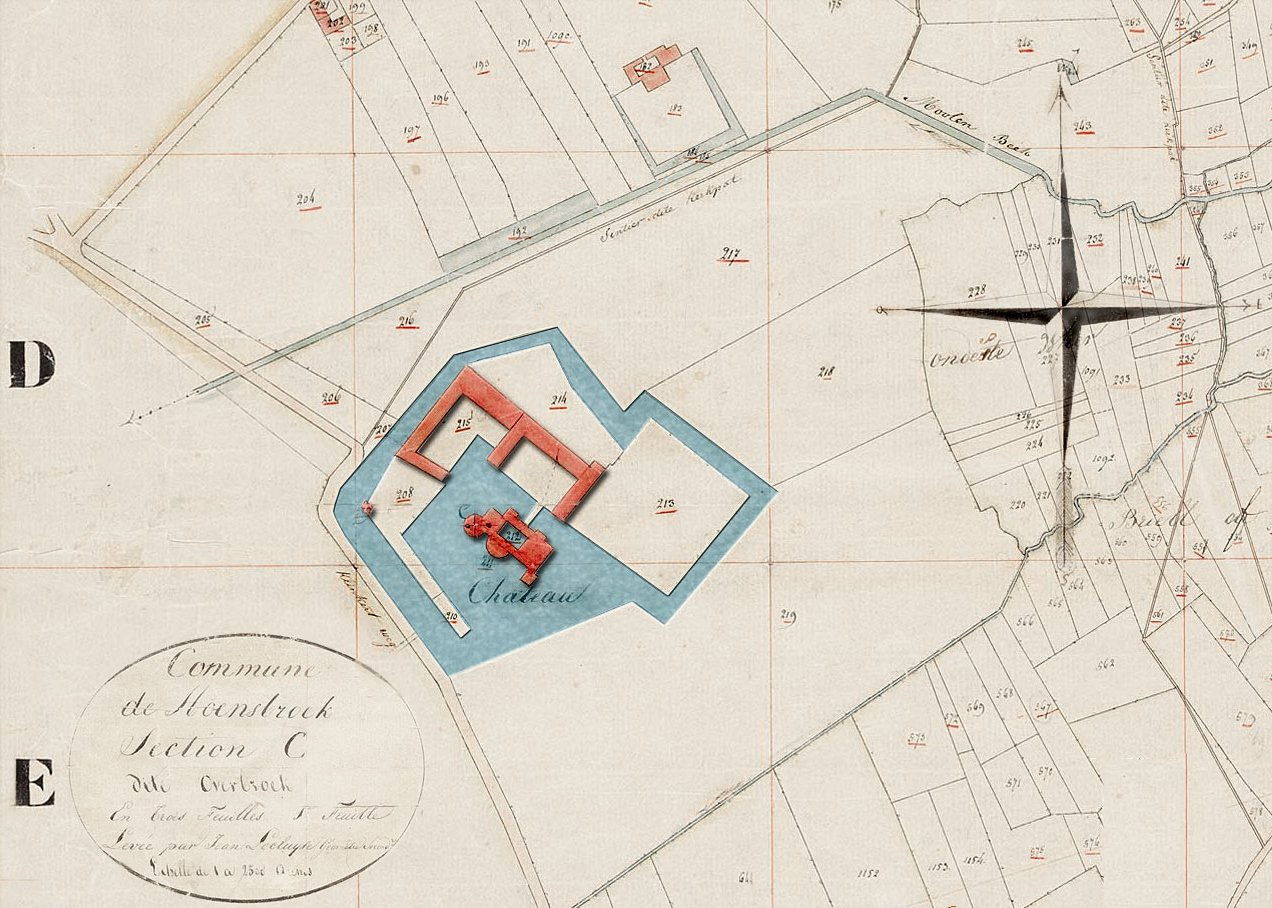
Map 1823

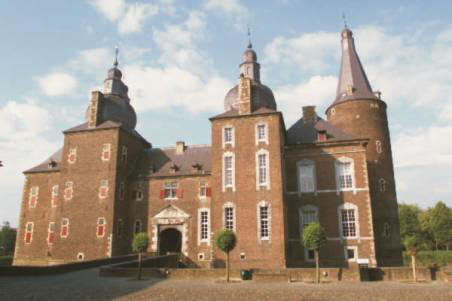
Front of the castle

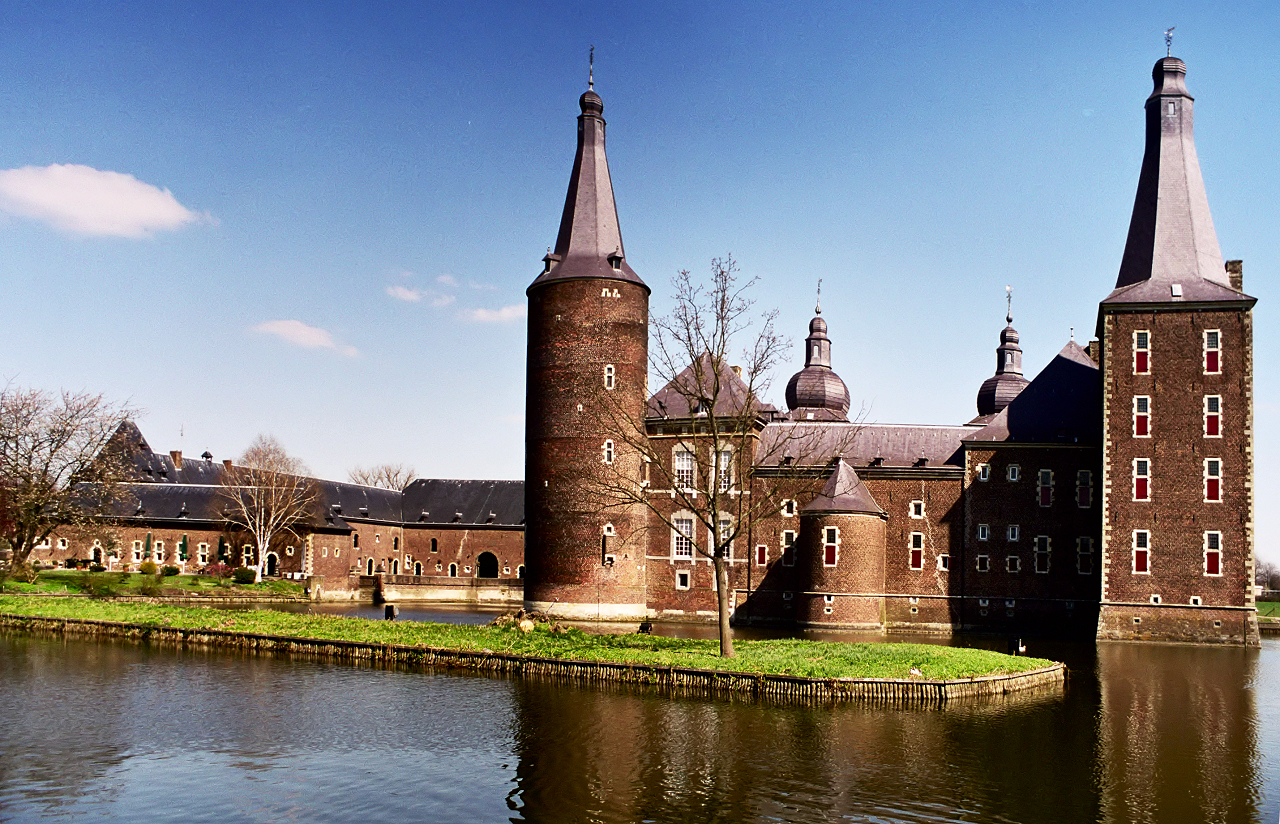
Castle in 2003

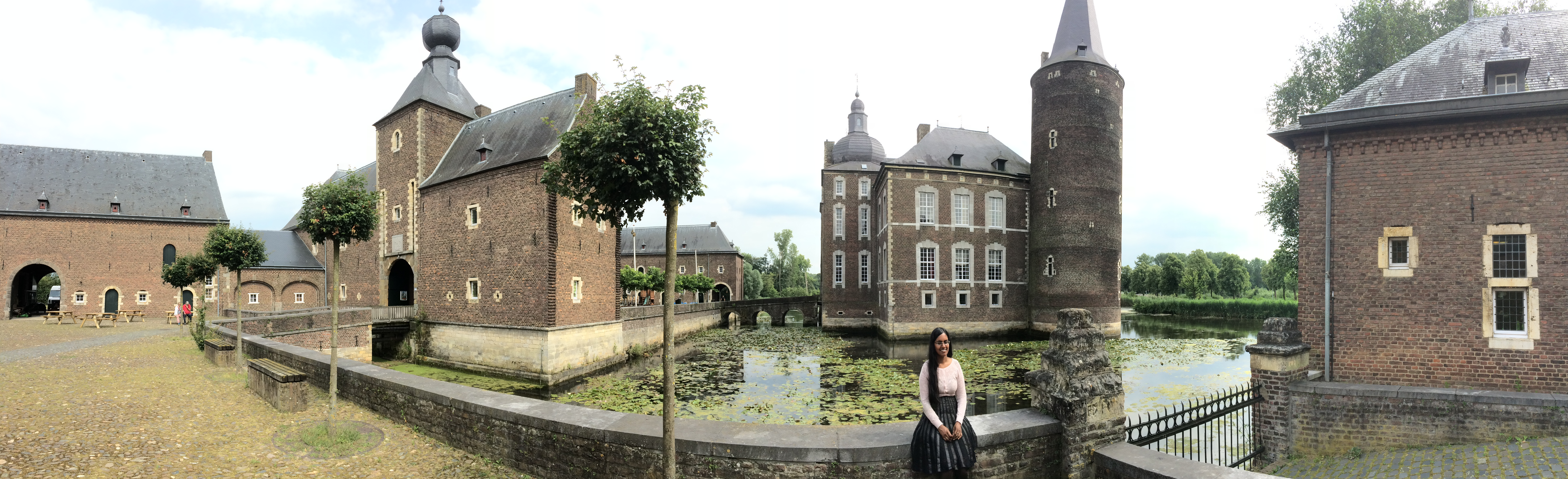
Panorama view

== See also ==
- Van Hoensbroeck
- List of castles in the Netherlands

== Sources ==
- Venne, J.M. van de, J. Th. H. de Win en P.A.H. Peeters, Geschiedenis van Hoensbroek, Hoensbroek: Gemeentebestuur van Hoensbroek, 1967.
