= Jesuit College of Ingolstadt =

Jesuit school in Germany

- German: Jesuitenkolleg Ingolstadt
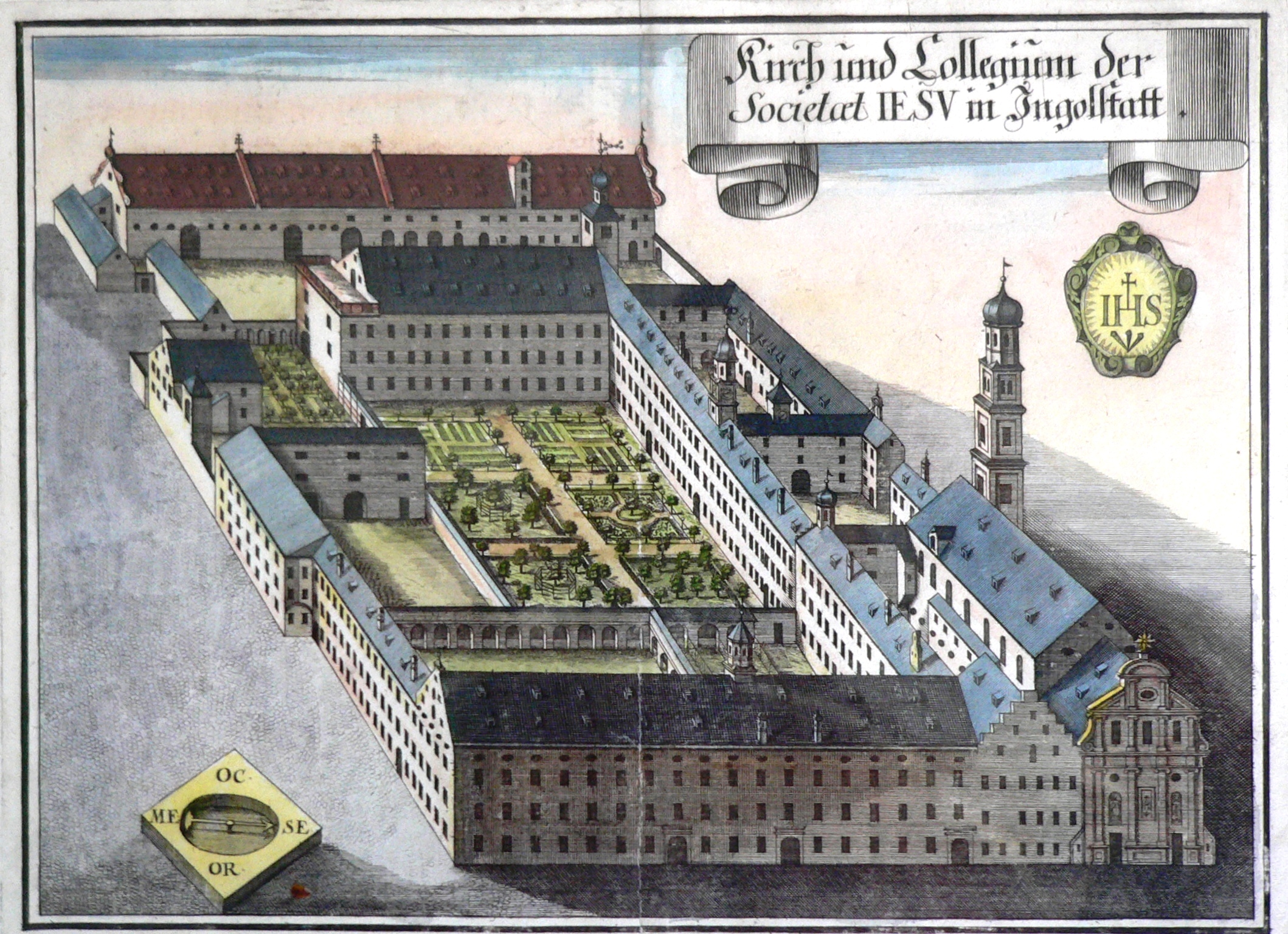
- Copper engraving of the college by Michael Wening
- Type: Jesuit College
- Active: 1556–1773
- Location: Ingolstadt, Electorate of Bavaria, Holy Roman Empire; 48.765278°N 11.420833°E

The Jesuit College of Ingolstadt (German: Jesuitenkolleg Ingolstadt) was a Jesuit school in Ingolstadt, in the Duchy and Electorate of Bavaria, founded in 1556, that operated until the suppression of the Jesuit Order in 1773. The college was the headquarters of the Jesuits in Germany, and became a center of the Counter-Reformation. Many of its members taught at the University of Ingolstadt.

== Early years ==
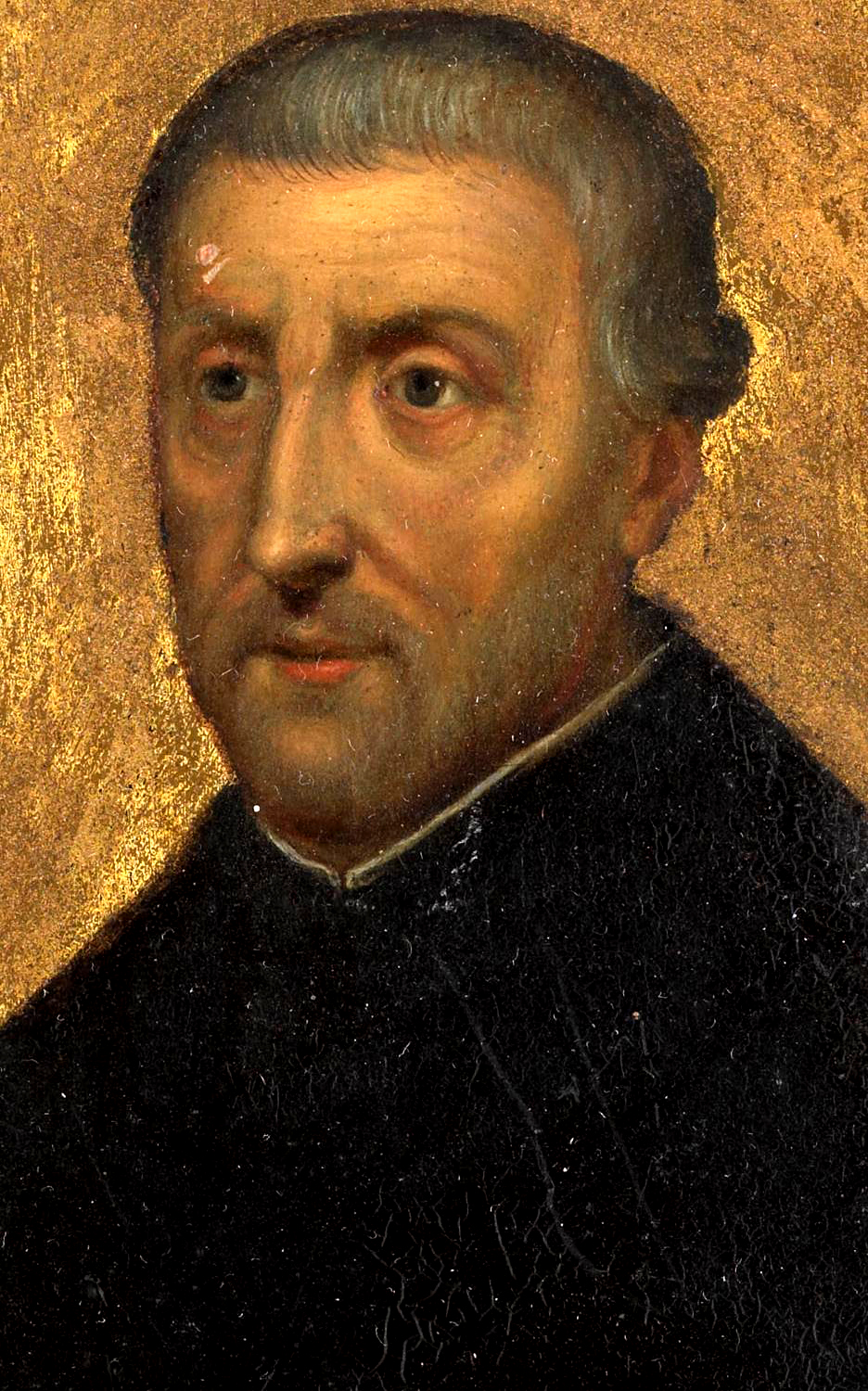
Peter Canisius (1521–1597), the founder

The University of Ingolstadt was founded in 1472 by Louis IX, Duke of Bavaria (1417–79). William IV, Duke of Bavaria, (1493–1550) arranged with Ignatius of Loyola for three Jesuits to lecture at the university in 1549. They were Alfonso Salmerón (1515–1585) of Spain, Claude Le Jay (c. 1504–1552) of Savoy and Peter Canisius (1521–1597) of the Netherlands. Canisius was elected first dean and then rector of the theological faculty, and from 1551–1552 was vice-chancellor. However, by February 1552 the three Jesuits had moved on to new assignments.

In 1555 Peter Canisius agreed with Albert V, Duke of Bavaria, (1528–1579) on the terms for establishing the Jesuit college. The initial concept of this and other early Jesuit colleges was that they should be endowed, giving them an assured income. They would be near a university but not formally associated with it. The college would provide accommodation for scholastics, who would attend the university or other colleges for classes. Ignatius of Loyola provided detailed instructions to the 18 Jesuits that were sent from Rome in 1556. He recommended that the fathers treated the local authorities with great respect and do all they could to obtain the support of influential people. Peter Canisius was the first head of the college, from 1555 until he moved to Switzerland in 1580. Ignatius established the German province of the Society of Jesus in 1556 and appointed Canisius as its first leader.

There were delays in constructing a building for the college due to financial problems. Work on the Collegium Albertinum eventually started in 1569 and was complete in 1574. The Jesuits occupied the college in 1576. That year the Jesuits founded the establishment of Convictus sancti Ignatii martyris (believers in Saint Ignatius of Antioch). The Albertinum was initially a college of the University of Ingolstadt, but in 1599 it was incorporated into the Jesuit college as a seminary. The seminarians could attend the university courses. The college became the center of the Jesuits in Germany. In 1589 Biburg Abbey, which had been closed since 1555 and held under sovereign administration, was given to the college. In 1591 the former Münchsmünster Abbey was given to the college as an endowment.

The Basilica di Santa Maria Maggiore in Rome held an image of the Virgin and Child attributed to Saint Luke. In the 6th century it was carried through the streets of Rome during an outbreak of plague. Around 1570 Francis Borgia donated a copy of the painting of Maria-Schnee (Mary of the Snows) to the college. This was a carefully made copy of the icon. In 1595 Father Jakob Rem founded the Colloquium Marianum during the dedication of a new altar at the Jesuit College of Ingolstadt. The image of the Virgin was placed above the altar On 6 April 1604, according to a Jesuit chronicle, the Virgin Mary appeared in a vision to father Jakob, who was moved to ask the choir to repeat the phrase Mater admirablis three times to please the Virgin. This repetition became a set part of the litany of the Colloquists. The icon, which was given the name Mater ter admirabilis after the miraculous event, became the focus for Marian devotion in the college. It was used during the Counter-Reformation as justification of the cult of images.

== Counter-Reformation ==
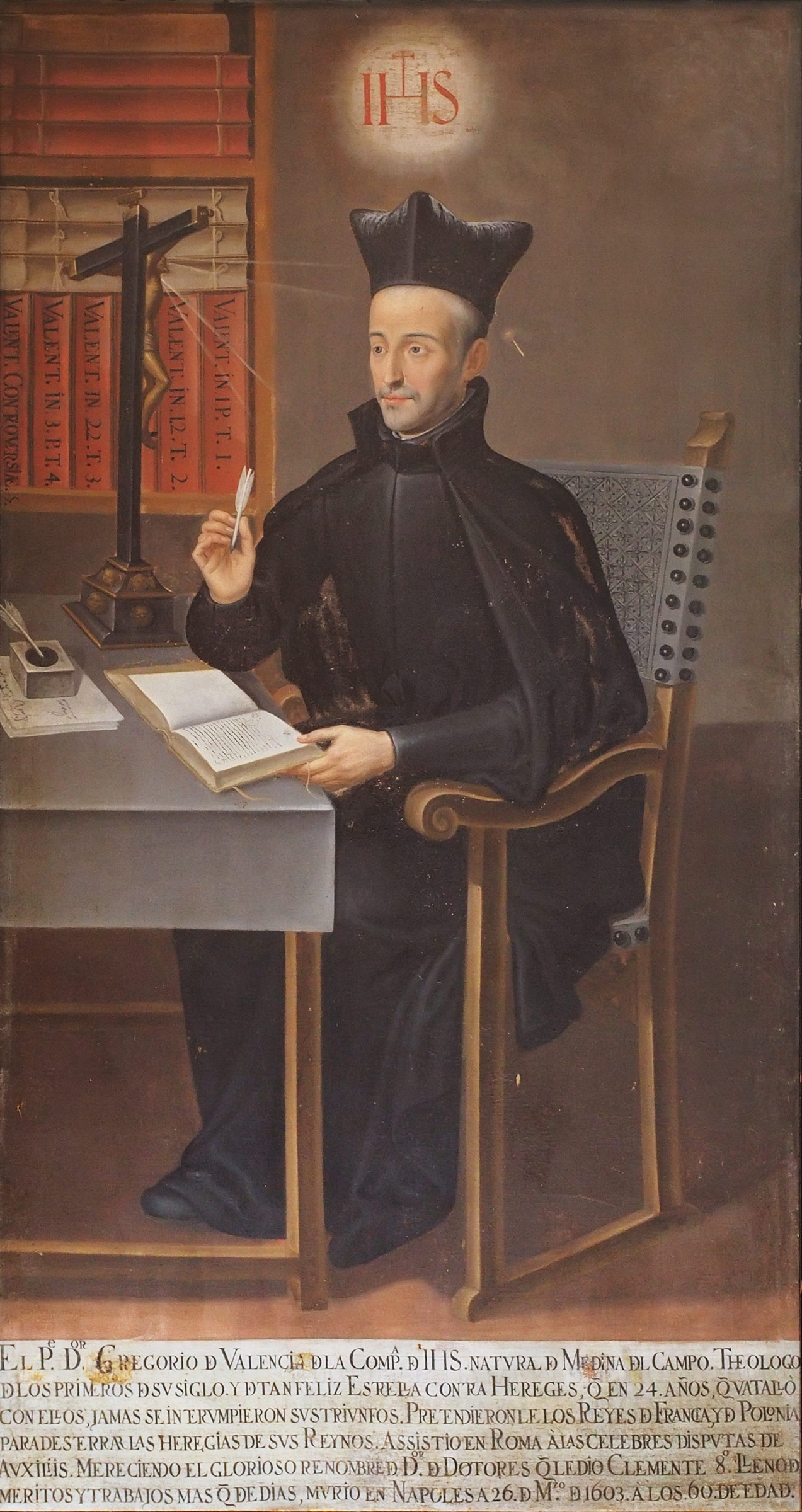
Gregory of Valencia (1549–1603) was a professor and member of the college for many years.

The Jesuit College was a base for the Counter-Reformation, with a focus on education. The Jesuits and their supporters soon dominated the University of Ingolstadt. In 1588 the faculty of Arts was transferred to the Jesuits but they never had complete control of the university. Arts and theology were the province of the Jesuits while lay professors taught law and medicine. The college became known as a center of learning. When Georg Eder (1523–87) was preparing to publish his Das guldene Flüß, he asked Duke Albert V to make sure the proofs were checked by Jesuit theologians who were fluent in German.

The Jesuits probably sponsored printing of Latin devotional works such as De Imitatione Christi by Thomas à Kempis, printed in Lyon in 1564 and recorded in the Ingolstadt college library in 1568. The Jesuits ran a secondary school, the paedagogium, which taught students Latin, Greek, poetry, dialectic and rhetoric in preparation for admission to the university. It had five hundred pupils in 1604–05. There was strong demand for admission to schools such as this, which the Jesuits had difficulty satisfying. Lutheran parents would even claim that they were Catholic so their sons could be admitted. Maximilian I, Elector of Bavaria, (1573–1651) established scholarships for the Jesuit college and the University of Ingolstadt early in his reign.

The Jesuits were instrumental in winning back much of southern Germany to the Roman Catholic Church. They had humanistic goals and followed the Tridentine reform in their education program. Jesuit scholars from the college who taught at the university included theologians, philosophers, linguists, mathematicians and astronomers. The Jesuit College of Ingolstadt became a cultural center of the highest rank. The Jesuits were both dramatists and directors of the Jesuit Theater, where students regularly put on performances. Jacob Bidermann (1578–1639) studied at the Jesuit College before moving to Munich and then to Rome. He was a prolific author of plays, novels, poems and hymns, one of the greatest of German playwrights of his day.

Christoph Scheiner (1575–1650) joined the college faculty in 1610 as a professor of Hebrew and mathematics. Scheiner was one of the first to use a telescope for astronomy. He invented the helioscope, a specialized instrument to view the sun. In March 1611 Scheiner and his student Johann Baptist Cysat (c. 1587–1657) observed sunspots. Scheiner delayed announcing his discovery for a year and then wrote of it in letters signed "Apelles" to disguise his identity since the presence of stains on the sun was counter to "conservative Christian doctrine". In conformity with the prevalent view that the heavens were pure and the Sun was "virginal", Scheiner concluded that the sunspots were the shadows of small planets orbiting close to the sun.

Scheiner's delay led to the dispute with Galileo Galilei over who had seen the sunspots first. In fact, others had independently observed sunspots before either Scheiner or Galileo. Scheiner eventually came to accept Galileo's view that the sunspots were in fact marks on the Sun's surface. Cysat succeeded Scheiner as professor of mathematics and astronomy from 1616 to 1622. Later Cysat was asked to become professor of mathematics at the Reales Estudios in Madrid, where he would be primarily concerned with military architecture.

== Thirty Years' War ==
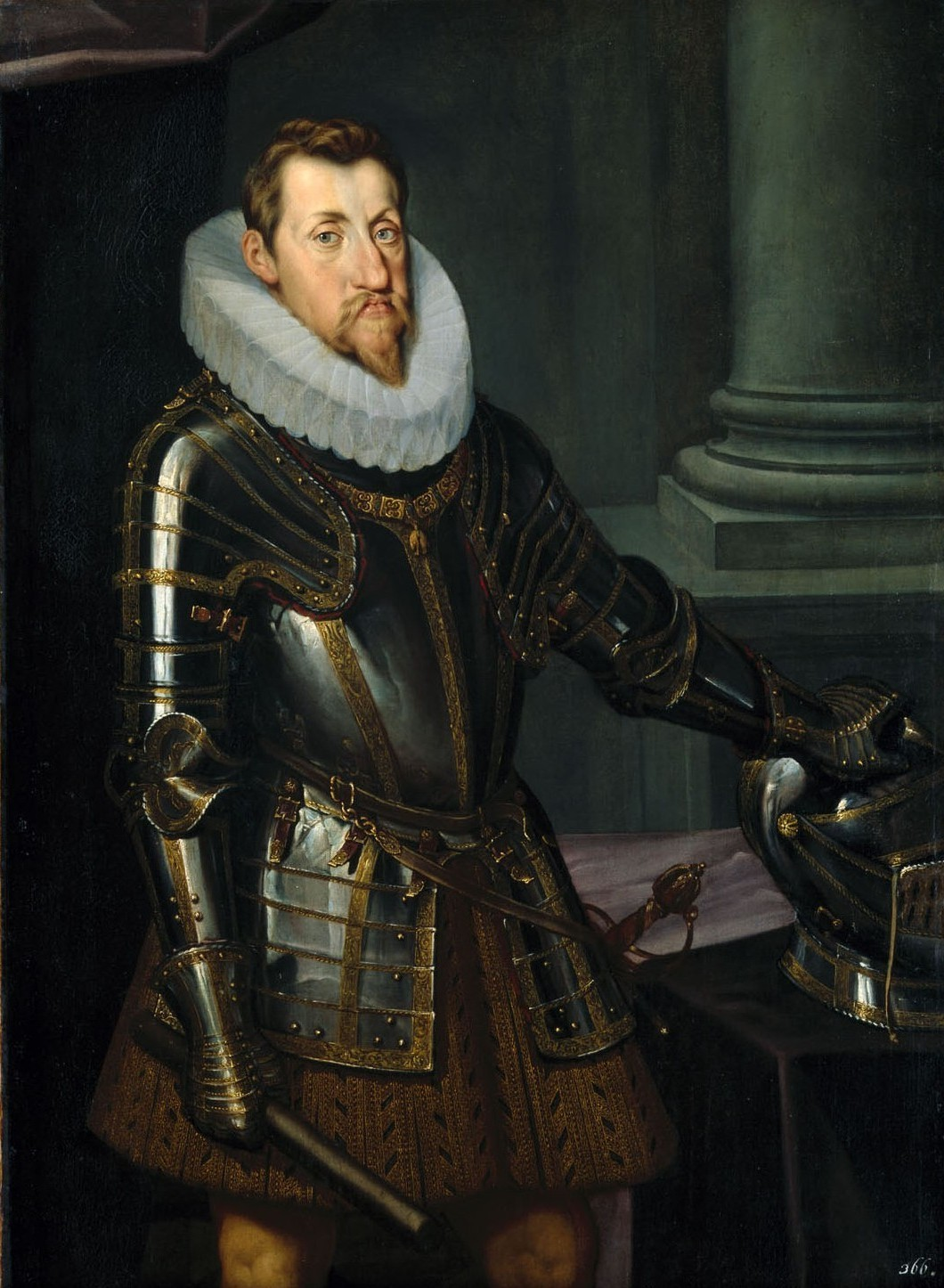
Ferdinand II, Holy Roman Emperor, an alumnus, was a rigid supporter of Catholicism during the Thirty Years' War.

Aristocratic students who became leaders on the Catholic side during the Thirty Years' War (1618–1648) included Ferdinand of Bavaria, Elector of Cologne, Maximilian I, Elector of Bavaria and Ferdinand II, Holy Roman Emperor. Maximilian and Ferdinand II became friends while students at Ingolstadt and would cooperate in the wars that followed. Ferdinand's studies at the college, reinforced by his Bavarian mother and his cousin Maximillian of Bavaria, made him a firm and rigid believer in Catholicism who would not accept any dissent in his realms. Ferdinand took the throne in 1595 and at once began active persecution of the Protestants. Maximilian of Bavaria, another alumnus of the college, was crowned in 1609 when the League of Catholic Princes was formed. He followed similar policies.

The Congregation of Mary Victorious was founded in Ingolstadt in 1612. In 1612 a book titled Monita Privata Societatis Jesu was printed in Kraków, Poland, allegedly containing the "testimonies of several Italian and Spanish Jesuits." Rome placed it on the index of forbidden books on 10 May 1616, and on 1 August 1617 a book by Jacob Gretser (1562–1625) of the Jesuit College of Ingolstadt gave reasons why the book should be considered a forgery.

The Thirty Years' War began with the Defenestrations of Prague on 23 May 1618. The causes were complex, involving control of property, trade, the balance of power and religious liberty. In 1630 King Gustavus Adolphus of Sweden landed in Germany and threatened to invade Bavaria. In 1631 Johann Christoph von Westerstetten, the prince-bishop of Eichstätt, came to the Jesuit College in Ingolstadt, perhaps seeking the protection of Duke Maximilian. He died in 1637 without returning to Eichstätt. In 1632 Gustavus Adolphus besieged Ingolstadt, where his opponent Johann Tserclaes, Count of Tilly, lay dying. On 10 September 1634, after news of the Catholic victory at Nördlingen reached the town, the Congregation of Mary Victorious, the Confraternity of Saint Sebastian and 1,000 lay people staged a solemn procession through the town. The war caused great damage before it ended in the compromise Peace of Westphalia on 24 October 1648.

== Age of Enlightenment ==
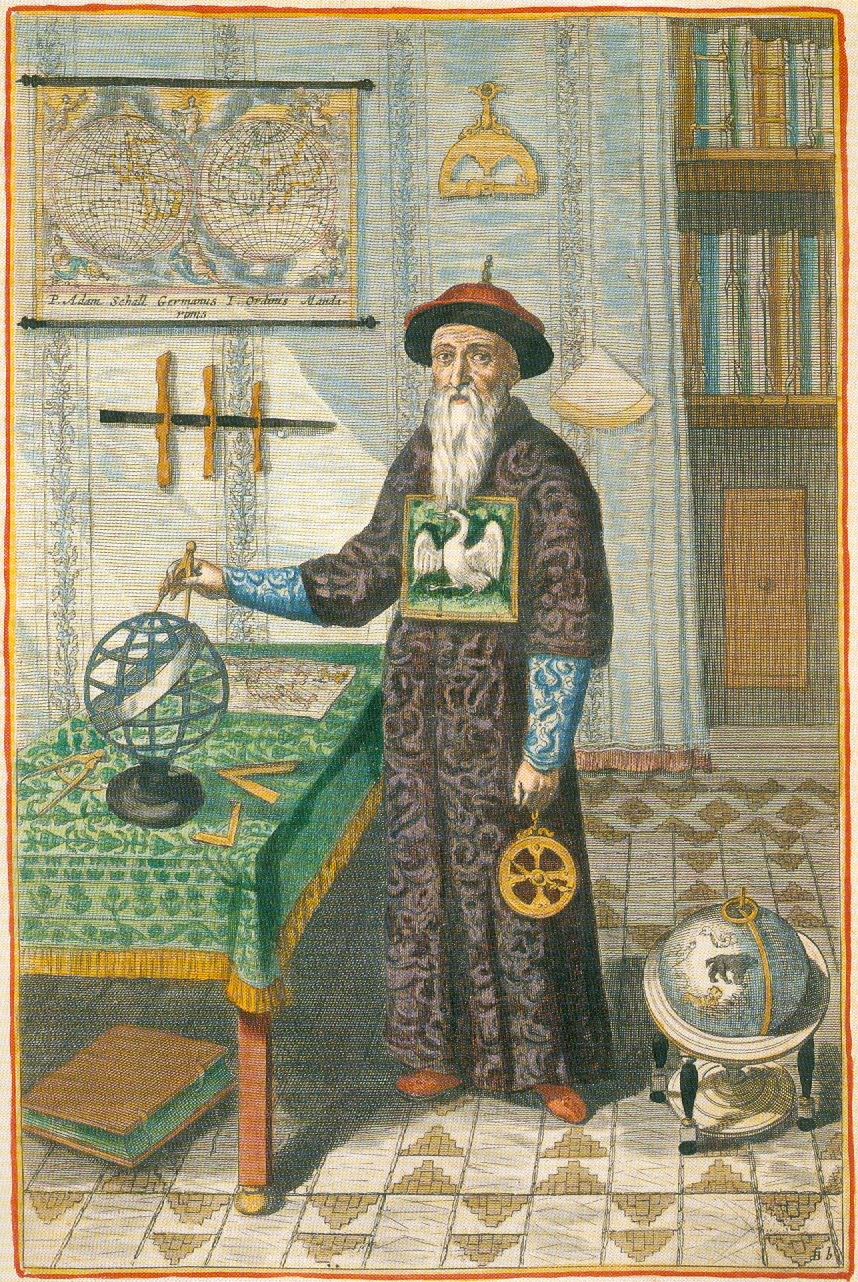
Johann Adam Schall von Bell sent the college Chinese astronomical material.

During the Age of Enlightenment, which can be roughly dated from the end of the Thirty Years' War to the start of the French Revolution in 1789, many thinkers believed that reason would free people from the suffering that they believed had been caused by superstition and religious oppression. The college continued to support scientific exploration and to spread the Catholic faith. The Jesuits promoted missionary activity and enlarged their collection at Ingolstadt with materials sent by missionaries from China and the Americas.

Bartholomew Holzhauser (1613–1658) came to Ingolstadt without money in 1633. Through charity he was able to study philosophy at the university, and then theology at the college. After receiving holy orders he became a rural priest in Austria, where he became known as a pastor, exorcist, curer of illness and prophet. He later moved to the rectory of Bingen in the Archbishopric of Mayence, where he met the future King Charles II of England (1630–1685), then still in exile. He advised Charles to protect the Catholic religion in England.

The Jesuit College of Ingolstadt played a leading role in sponsoring the China mission in the mid-17th century. While in China, the missionaries undertook astronomical observations. On 27 July 1671 the college received a volume containing five Chinese astronomical texts sent by Johann Adam Schall von Bell (1592–1666) before his death. In 1688 the Jesuits took full control of teaching in the University of Ingolstadt faculty of philosophy.

Eusebio Francisco Kino (1645–1711) studied at the college under the mathematician Wolfgang Leinberer, who was in turn a pupil of Athanasius Kircher. Kino adapted one of the towers of the college for use as an observatory. Kino had ambitions to go to China, but ended up in New Spain, which he reached in 1681. He brought various small mathematical instruments, since he could see the value of scientific knowledge in missionary activity. A spectacular comet appeared in November 1680 which Kino observed in Spain until January, and during his crossing of the Atlantic to Vera Cruz in February. In June 1681 Kino wrote an Astronomical Exposition of the Comet, in which he gave the opinion that the comet had presaged the great earthquake of 23 June 1681 in Mexico City. He then moved on to missionary work in Sonora. Philipp Segesser (1689–1762) studied at the Jesuit College between 1717 and 1721. He would spend almost thirty years as a missionary in the Pimería Alta in New Spain.

Opposition to the Jesuits rose in the mid-18th century. Johann Adam von Ickstatt, a student of the rationalist philosopher Christian Wolff, was appointed director of the University of Ingolstadt in 1746 and was quietly opposed to the Jesuits. In 1749 his friend Johann Georg von Lori took a more open stand against them. With the 1759 foundation in Munich of the Bavarian Academy of Science, the university became increasingly hostile to ecclesiastical influences. On 21 June 1773 Pope Clement XIV abolished the Jesuit Order and the college was closed. Adam Weishaupt (1748–1830) founded the powerful secret society, the Illuminati, on 1 May 1776. He had been educated at the college. The University of Ingolstadt was transferred to Landshut in 1800, and then to Munich in 1826.

== Buildings ==
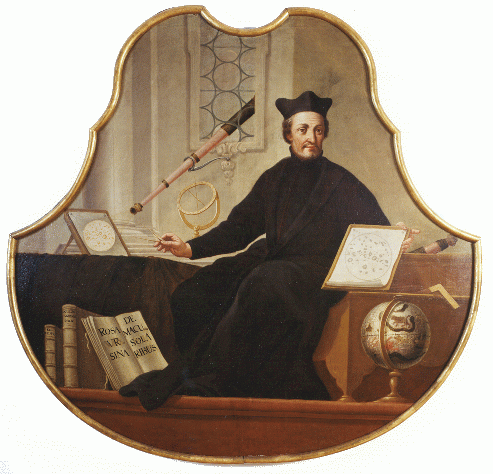
Christoph Scheiner observed sunspots in 1611 while at the college. This portrait was made for the Orban Hall by Christoph Thomas Scheffler around 1730.

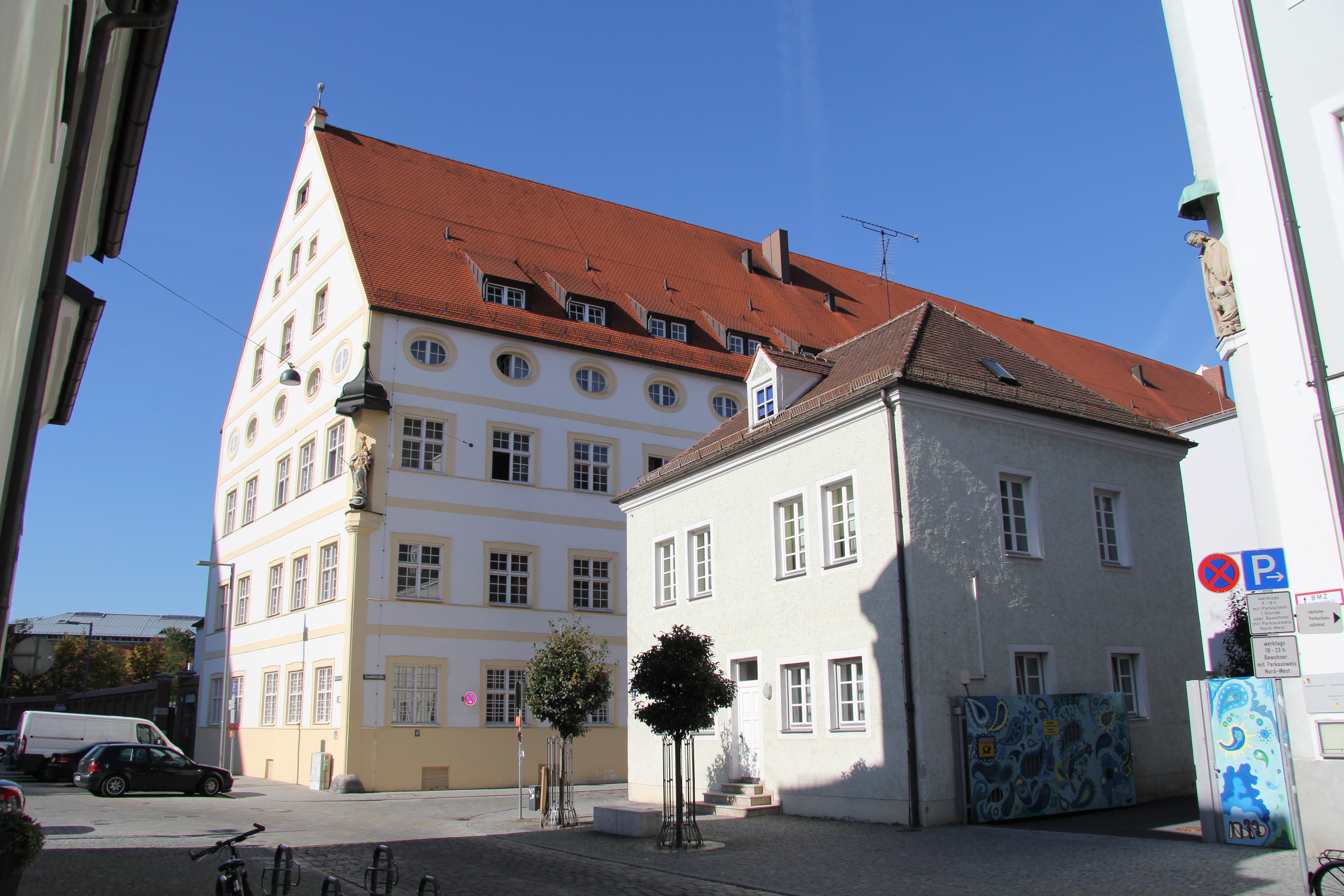
The Canisius Seminary

Plans for the Jesuit college were prepared in 1555 by Georg Stern, a local architect. Due to Duke Albert's chronic shortage of money, the college was not opened until 1576. By then Georg Stern's son had built the Gothic-style Chapel of Saint Jerome at the northeast corner of the Albertinum seminary. In 1581 Duke William V endowed the chapel's single altar, and gave it the painting of Saint Jerome by Christoph Schwarz. To accommodate the growing number of Jesuits and their students, in 1582 William V arranged for the Jesuits to take over a library that Johann Eglof von Knöringen, Bishop of Augsburg (r. 1573–75) had erected.

Wilhelm Egckl, the duke's baumeister in Munich, drew up plans for a new church in a relatively narrow space in front of the gymnasium between 1582 and 1585. The foundation stone was laid on 30 September 1587 and the Holy Cross church was consecrated on 29 October 1589. The chapel of Saint Jerome became the forehall to the new church. Steps and a triple arch led from it into the new nave. The nave and choir were a large rectangular room. A gallery was placed over the chapel and the first bay of the nave to provide additional space. A large sacristy was accessed from doors on each side of the high altar. In 1611 another gallery was added above the sacristry. In 1624 Johann Holl enlarged the nave to include six side-chapels between large interior buttresses, with new galleries above the side chapels for use by students of theology and philosophy. The original flat cassette-style wooden ceiling of the nave was replaced by a broad barrel vault decorated with frescoes and stucco.

Ferdinand Orban (1655–1732), Professor of Mathematics, made a valuable collection of natural and artificial curiosities and scientific instruments, as well as texts on foreign languages. The collection began as a museum of mathematical objects, and was expanded by donations from noblemen and Jesuit missionaries. Orban started his collection in Innsbruck in 1689, and it was moved several times before reaching the Jesuit College in 1724. Around 1725 the Orban Hall was built to house the collection. The corners of the ceiling of the Baroque-style hall held portraits by Christoph Thomas Scheffler (1699–1756). In frames the shape of a double bass they depict Athanasius Kircher, Christoph Scheiner, Christopher Clavius and Johann Baptist Cysat. The vault of the hall was decorated in stucco with frescoes and oil paintings. It depicted the heavens and earth, the arts and sciences, theology and the wisdom of God. The four paintings of scientists have survived, as has the stucco. The rest has been destroyed. Most of the collection is now held by the Universitätsbibliothek in Munich.

After the Jesuits left the college was used for military purposes. The Holy Cross church was torn down in 1859 to make space for army barracks. In 1920 a surviving part of the college became a Seminary. The building was changed significantly to make apartments for students at the Catholic University of Eichstätt-Ingolstadt, although some of the larger rooms have been preserved. It provides accommodation on the upper floors for the Sisters of St Paul and classrooms for the Gnadenthal school.

== Noted members ==
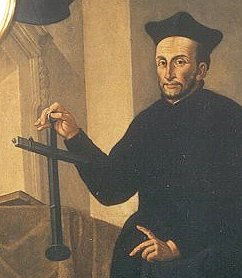
Johann Baptist Cysat (1586–1657) holding a Jacob's staff, a precursor of the sextant

Noted members of the college included:

- Peter Canisius (1521–1597), theologian
- Gregory of Valencia (1549–1603), humanist and theologian
- Jacob Gretser (1562–1625), theologian and polemicist
- Adam Tanner (1572–1632), mathematician and theologian
- Christoph Scheiner (1575–1650), mathematician and astronomer
- Johann Lantz (d. 1638), mathematician
- Jacob Bidermann (1578–1639), playwright
- Johann Baptist Cysat (1586–1657), mathematician and astronomer
- Jakob Balde (1604–1668), Latinist and preacher
- Ignaz Kögler (1680–1746), mathematician, Hebrew scholar and missionary
- Anton Gogeisl (1701–1771), astronomer and missionary
- Benedict Stattler (1728–1797), theologian
- Johann Nepomuk Mederer (1734–1808), historian of the University of Ingolstadt.
- Franz von Paula Schrank (1747–1835), botanist
- Johann Michael Sailer (1751–1832), theologian

== See also ==
- List of Jesuit sites
