= Clemens Alois Baader =

German Roman Catholic theologian (1762–1838)

Clemens Alois Baader, also spelled Klement Alois Baader or Klemens Alois Baader (8 April 1762 in Munich – 23 March 1838 in Munich) was a German Roman Catholic theologian.

== Biography ==
He was the son of personal physician Joseph Franz von Paula Baader (1733–1794). He attended a high school in Munich before he studied theology at the University of Ingolstadt, where he earned a doctor's degree in philosophy (Dr. phil.). Then he was active in the consistories of Augsburg and Salzburg. He became a canon of Freising on 25 August 1787. He was appointed a member of the Academy of sciences of his native city on 30 May 1797, then of the Erfurt Academy of Sciences of Public Utility on 10 July 1797. He was called to Salzburg in 1811, then to Burghausen in 1816 and came back to his native town in on 22 March 1817. He spent his retirement in Munich and died in 1838. In 1807, he became a corresponding member of the Bavarian Academy of Sciences and Humanities.

== Works ==
- Fragmente a. d. Tagebuche eines Menschen und Christen (1791)
- Reisen durch verschiedene Gegenden Deutschlands in Briefen (two volumes; from 1795 to 1797)
- Eduards Briefe über die französische Revolution (1796)
- Gedanken und Vorschläge eines bairischen Patrioten in drei Briefen über Geistlichkeit und Landschulen (1801)
- Aussichten, Wünsche und Beruhigung fürs Vaterland (1801)
- Nothwendigkeit der individuellen Säcularisation etc. (1802)
- Das gelehrte Baiern oder Lexikon aller Schriftsteller, welche Baiern im 18. Jahrhundert erzeugte, A–K (1804; no further volume published)
- Kurze Geschichte der Kriegsvorfälle zu Ulm im Spätherbst 1805 (1806)
- Blumen aus verschiedenen Gärten, Aphorismen etc. (from 1822 to 1824)
- Freundschaftliche Briefe (1823)
- Lexikon verstorbener bairischer Schriftsteller des 18. und 19. Jahrhunderts (two volumes; from 1824 to 1825)

== General references ==
- Ernst Kelchner (1875). "Baader, Klemens Alois". Allgemeine Deutsche Biographie (in German). Vol. 1. Leipzig: Duncker & Humblot. pp. 712–713.
- Franz Xaver Seppelt (1953). "Baader, Klemens Alois". Neue Deutsche Biographie (in German). Vol. 1. Berlin: Duncker & Humblot. pp. 476–476. (full text online).
