= Johann Georg Melchior Schmidtner =

German painter (1625–1705)

Johann Georg Melchior Schmittner
- Born: 1625; Augsburg
- Died: 1705 (aged 79–80); Augsburg

Johann Georg Melchior Schmidtner (1625 – 1705) was a German Baroque painter.

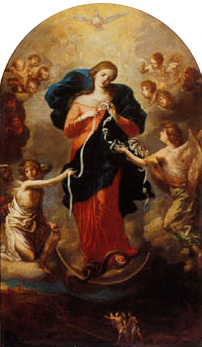
Mary Untier of Knots

He became a pupil of the painter Johann Heinrich Schönfeld, and spent 15 years in Italy. Schmidtner is known for his altarpieces in churches near his home in Augsburg.

== Works ==
- Die Sieben Geschenke des Heiligen Geistes (1685; Augsburg, Schaezlerpalais)
- Aufnahme des Hl. Martin in den Himmel (1690; Hauptaltarbild von St. Martin in Lamerdingen)
- Kreuzabnahme Christi (1685; Hauptaltarbild von St. Wolfgang in Mickhausen)
- Maria Knotenlöserin (1687; Augsburg, St. Peter am Perlach)

== Literature ==
- Claudia Madel: Die Nachfolge Johann Heinrich Schönfelds unter besonderer Berücksichtigung der Maler Johann Georg Melchior Schmidtner und Johann Georg Knappich, 1987 (Dissertation); Findhinweis
- Denis André Chevalley: Der Dom zu Augsburg, Band 1 von Kunstdenkmäler von Bayern, Oldenbourg Verlag, 1995, Seite 526, ISBN 3486559605
- Sibylle Appuhn-Radtke: Visuelle Medien im Dienst der Gesellschaft Jesu, Schnell und Steiner, 2000, Seiten 156 und 157, ISBN 3795412838; Ausschnitte aus der Quelle
- Peter Stoll: Darstellungen des hl. Martin aus dem Umkreis von Johann Heinrich Schönfeld in Jengen und Langenneufnach. Universitätsbibliothek, Augsburg 2014 Volltext
