= Mary, Untier of Knots =

Painting by Johann Georg Melchior Schmidtner

Our Lady Untier of Knots
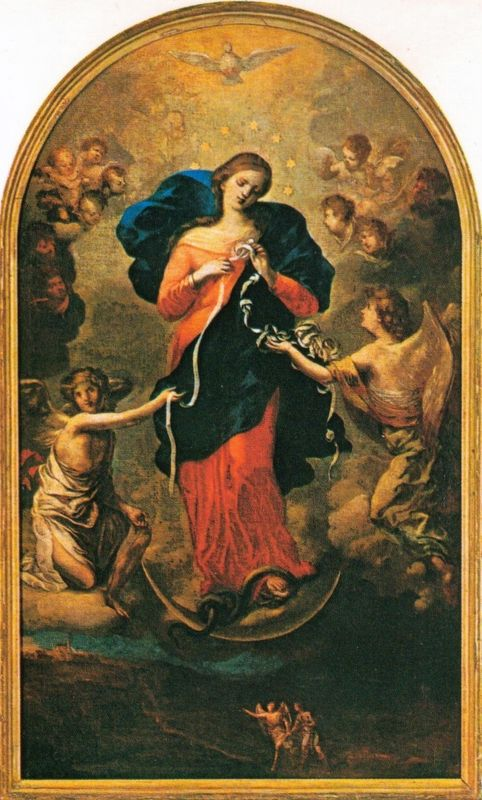
- Mary, Untier of Knots, by Johann Georg Schmidtner
- Venerated in: Catholic Church
- Feast: 28 September (Local), 8 December (Immaculate Conception)
- Attributes: Mary untying knots in a white ribbon, crowned by the Holy Spirit, treading on a serpent
- Patronage: Difficulties, complex problems, marriage problems

Mary, Untier of Knots
- Nuestra Señora de Knotenlöserin (Spanish), Maria Knotenlöserin (German)
- Artist: Johann Georg Schmidtner
- Year: c. 1700
- Type: Oil on poplar
- Dimensions: 182 cm × 110 cm (72 in × 43 in)
- Location: St. Peter am Perlach, Augsburg, Germany

Mary, Untier of Knots or Mary, Undoer of Knots or Our Lady, Undoer of Knots is the name of both a Marian devotion and a specific Baroque painting (German: Wallfahrtsbild or Gnadenbild) which represents the devotion. The painting by Johann Georg Melchior Schmidtner, of around 1700, is in the Catholic pilgrimage church of St. Peter am Perlach, otherwise known as the Perlach Church, in Augsburg, Bavaria, Germany. Devotion to the image had once been limited to certain countries in Latin America (e.g., Argentina, Brazil), but became known worldwide since the 2013 election of Pope Francis.

== Painting ==
The painting, executed in the Baroque style by Johann Georg Melchior Schmidtner (1625–1707), shows the Blessed Virgin Mary as the Woman of the Apocalypse. She stands on the crescent moon (the usual way of showing her title of the Immaculate Conception), her head crowned by a circle of stars. The Holy Spirit in the form of a dove hovers above, as angels surround her. She is focused on untying knots in a long ribbon, while her foot tramples the head of a "knotted" snake, representing the Devil. This act fulfills God’s prophecy in Genesis 3:15: "I will put enmities between thee and the woman, and thy seed and her seed: she shall crush thy head, and thou shalt lie in wait for her heel."

Below is a human figure being led by an angel, usually interpreted as Tobias and the Angel (the Archangel Raphael) traveling. The two small figures have also been interpreted as a representation of Wolfgang Langenmantel, the grandfather of the benefactor, guided in his distress by a guardian angel to Father Jakob Rem in Ingolstadt. Although certain copies and reproductions show a dog accompanying the two figures (standard in Tobias and the Angel), there is no dog in the original painting.

The concept of Mary untying knots is derived from a work by Saint Irenaeus of Lyons, Adversus haereses (Against Heresies). In Book III, Chapter 22, he presents a parallel between Eve and Mary, describing how "the knot of Eve's disobedience was loosed by the obedience of Mary. For what the virgin Eve had bound fast through unbelief, this did the virgin Mary set free through faith."

== History ==
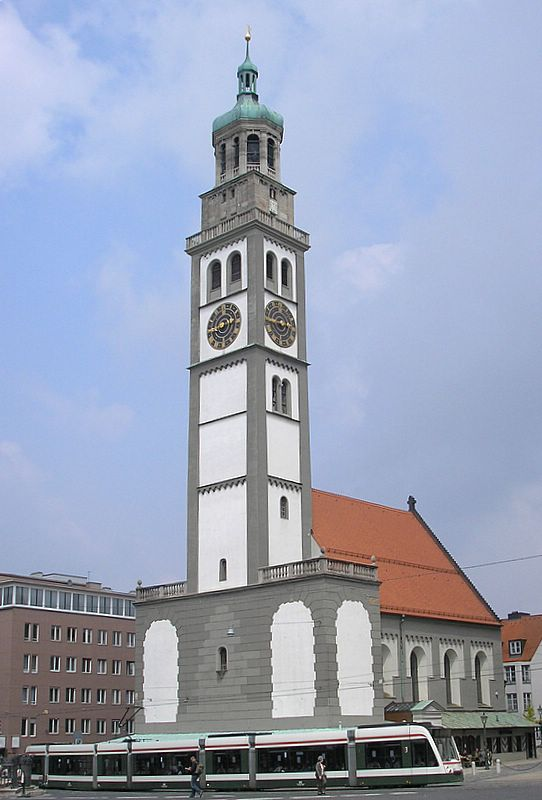
St. Peter's Church with the Perlach-Tower

The painting was donated around 1700 by Hieronymus Ambrosius Langenmantel (1641-1718), a doctor in canon law and a canon of the Monastery of Saint Peter in Augsburg. Langenmantel was a friend of the Egyptologist, alchemist, and esotericist Athanasius Kircher, as well as a member of the Fruchtbringenden Gesellschaft (Society of the Carpophores), which exerted a considerable influence on the nascent German Freemasonry.

The donation is said to be connected with an event in his family. His grandfather, Wolfgang Langenmantel (1586-1637) was on the verge of separation from his wife Sophia Rentz (1590-1649), and therefore sought help from Jakob Rem, a Jesuit priest in Ingolstadt. Fr Rem prayed before the Mater ter admirabilis image of the Blessed Virgin Mary and said: "In diesem religiösen Akt erhebe ich das Band der Ehe, löse alle Knoten und glätte es [In this religious act, I raise the bonds of matrimony, to untie all knots and smoothen them]". Immediately, peace was restored between the husband and wife, and the separation did not happen. In memory of this event, their grandson commissioned the painting of Mary as "Untier of Knots".

Although the tradition is that the image was painted in thanksgiving from H.A. Langenmantel for his grandparents' marriage being saved through Fr Rem's intercession, research has been unable to prove a connection between the two events. According to Dr. Leo Hintermayr, the story associated with the image and its title, Untier of Knots, emerged in the second half of the 20th century.

== Devotion ==
The first chapel dedicated to "Mary, Untier of Knots" was completed in 1989 in Styria, Austria, as a supplication following the Chernobyl disaster. The image of "Mary, Undoer of Knots" is especially venerated in Argentina and Brazil, where churches have been named for her and devotion to her has become widespread and which The Guardian called a "religious craze".

This devotion was popularised worldwide by Cardinal Jorge Mario Bergoglio, Archbishop of Buenos Aires, after his election as the 266th Pope of the Catholic Church in 2013.

It was thought that while still a younger priest, Bergoglio had seen the actual painting in Augsburg and brought a copy of it to Argentina. In a 2017 interview for the German newsweekly Die Zeit, Pope Francis stated that he had never been to Augsburg, and that a German nun once sent him a Christmas card with the image, arousing his interest. Bergoglio then sent seminarians with copies of the image to the slums of Buenos Aires, where the faithful were overwhelmed by the depiction of Mary as a problem-solver. He then commissioned Barbara Klimmeck, an exchange student from Eichstätt, to document the Augsburg original with all its details so that a copy could be made. This was done in Buenos Aires by the artist Ana de Betta Berti, for the Church of San José del Talar, where it has been enshrined since 8 December 1996. On the eighth day of each month, thousands make pilgrimage to that church to venerate the image.

The devotion reached Brazil by the end of the 20th century. According to Regina Novaes, of the Institute of Religious Studies in Rio de Janeiro, Mary, Untier of Knots "attracts people with small problems". Then-Cardinal Bergoglio had this image of Mary engraved on a chalice he presented to then-Pope Benedict XVI. Another chalice with the image, by the same silversmith, was presented to Pope Francis by the Argentine people.

Knowing of Pope Francis' special devotion to the image, South Korean ambassador to the Vatican Lee Baek-Man in 2018 presented him with a Korean rendition of the painting.

On 31 May 2021, Pope Francis crowned a copy of Mary, Untier of Knots, in the Vatican Gardens.

The devotion to Mary, the Untier of Knots, can be found at numerous religious sites worldwide. The feast day of Mary, Untier of Knots, is on 28 September, but it is not officially listed in the present General Roman Calendar.

=== Title in other languages ===
Mary, Untier of Knots, has different names in other languages:

- English: Mary, Untier of Knots; Mary, Undoer of Knots; Mary who Unties the Knots
- Arabic: العذراء التي تحل العقد (ʿAḏrāʾ allatī taḥullu l-ʿuqad)
- Chinese: 解結聖母瑪利亞 (Pinyin: Jiějié Shèngmǔ Mǎlìyà)
- Croatian: Marija koja razvezuje čvorove
- Dutch: Maria die de knopen ontwart
- French: Marie qui défait les Nœuds
- German: Maria Knotenlöserin
- Hungarian: A csomókat feloldó Mária
- Ido: Maria Desliganta la Nodi
- Italian: Maria che Scioglie i Nodi
- Malayalam: കുരുക്കുകളഴിക്കുന്ന മാതാവ് (Kurukkukal azhikunna madhavu)
- Maltese: Il-Madonna tal-Għoqiedi
- Polish: Maria Rozwiązująca Węzły
- Portuguese: Maria Desatadora dos Nós; Nossa Senhora Desatadora dos Nós
- Spanish: María Desatanudos; María, Desatadora de Nudos; María, la que Desata los Nudos
- Russian: Мария, развязывающая узлы (Mariya, razvyazyvajushchaya uzly)
- Sinhala: ශු. මරිය තුමිය, ගැටලිහීමේ දේවමාතාවෝ
- Tagalog: Maria, Tagakalág ng mga Buhól ng Buhay; Ináng Desay
- Tamil: துன்ப முடிச்சுக்களை அவிழ்க்கும் அன்னை
- Thai: พระนางมารีย์ ผู้แก้ปม; แม่พระแก้ปม

== See also ==
- Marian devotions
- Turamichele, the Archangel Michael at the Perlach-Tower
- Girdle of Thomas
