= St. Peter am Perlach =

Church building in Augsburg, Germany

Coordinates: 48°22′09″N 10°53′55″E

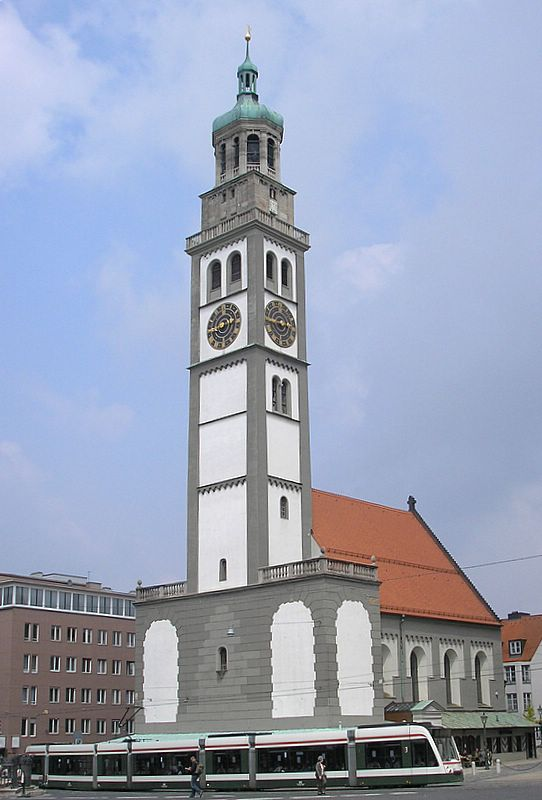
St. Peter with Perlachturm

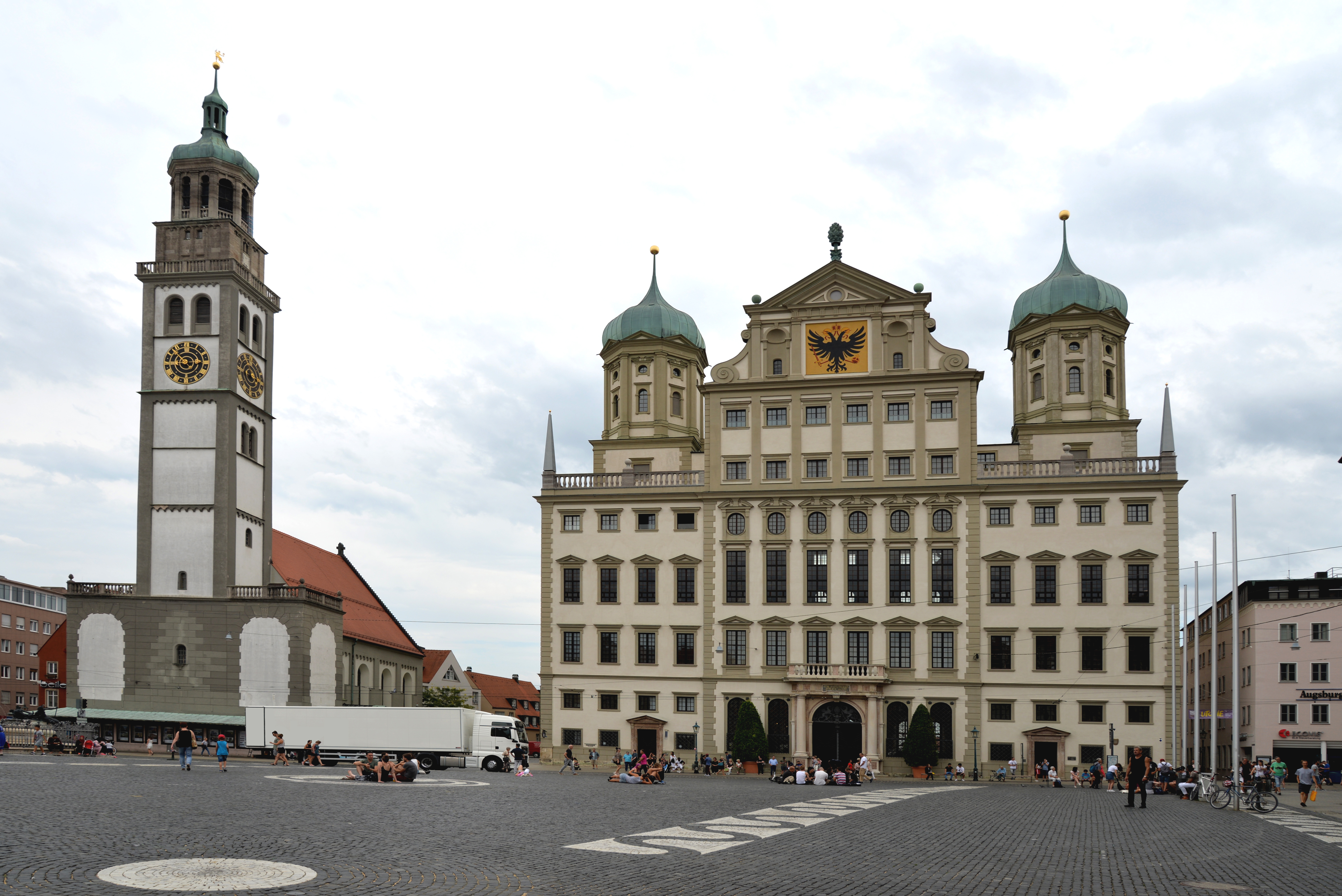
Perlachtower with Town Hall

St. Peter am Perlach or Perlach-Church is a romanesque Catholic church in the center of Augsburg (Bavaria). The tower of the church, the Perlachturm, is together with the Augsburg Town Hall the landmark of Augsburg.

== Mary Untier of Knots ==
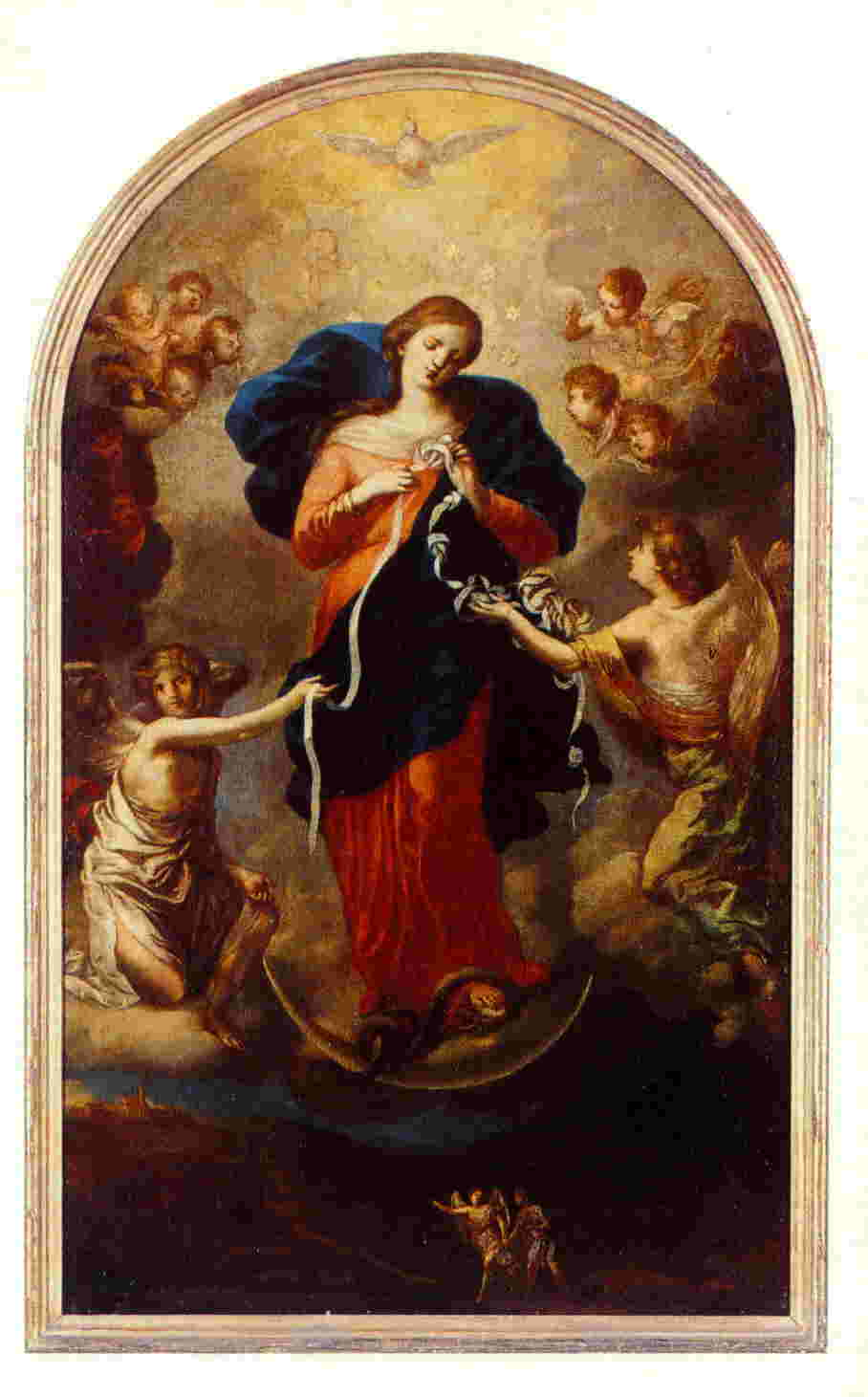
Mary Untier of Knots

The image and Marian devotion in St. Peter Mary Untier of Knots is also known in Latin America miraculous image of Mary Knots. A copy of the painting is in San José del Talar a church in Buenos Aires (Argentina).

== See also ==
- The Turamichele of Perlachtower
- List of Jesuit sites
