= Colloquium Marianum =

Colloquium Marianum was an elite type of Marian sodality, founded by Jesuit Father Jakob Rem of the Jesuit Seminary at Ingolstadt in 1594 AD in Ingolstadt, Bavaria, with the aim to reach holiness of life through an ever-deeper love of the Virgin Mary.

== Description ==
Membership in the Colloquium Marianum, an elite group within the Sodality of Our Lady, was based on a virtuous life, free of cardinal sins. Daily masses in front of the picture of the Mater ter admirabilis and weekly meetings and discussions under her picture were to assist the members in apostolic fervor and a spiritual Marian life style. The congregation was approved in 1612 by Pope Paul V and thereafter, Father Rem admitted 400 new members. During the Thirty Years' War (1618-1648), the Colloquium Marianum contributed to the prayerful defence of the faith with thousands of male members. Being an elite organization, it included well-known members from politics and Church politics at that time. During the Age of Enlightenment, and after the Jesuit Order was outlawed by Pope Clement XIV in 1773, the colloquium lost membership and gradually disappeared. The Schönstatt movement and the Legion of Mary resurrected the idea of Father Rem successfully in the 20th century.

== Sources ==
- Rudolf Graber, Colloquium Marianum (Romanum), in Lexikon der Marienkunde, Regensburg, 1967
- Sr. M. Danielle Peters, "400 Years 'Mother Thrice Admirable,'" The Mary Page, 2004.
