= Johann Lantz =

German mathematician and Jesuit

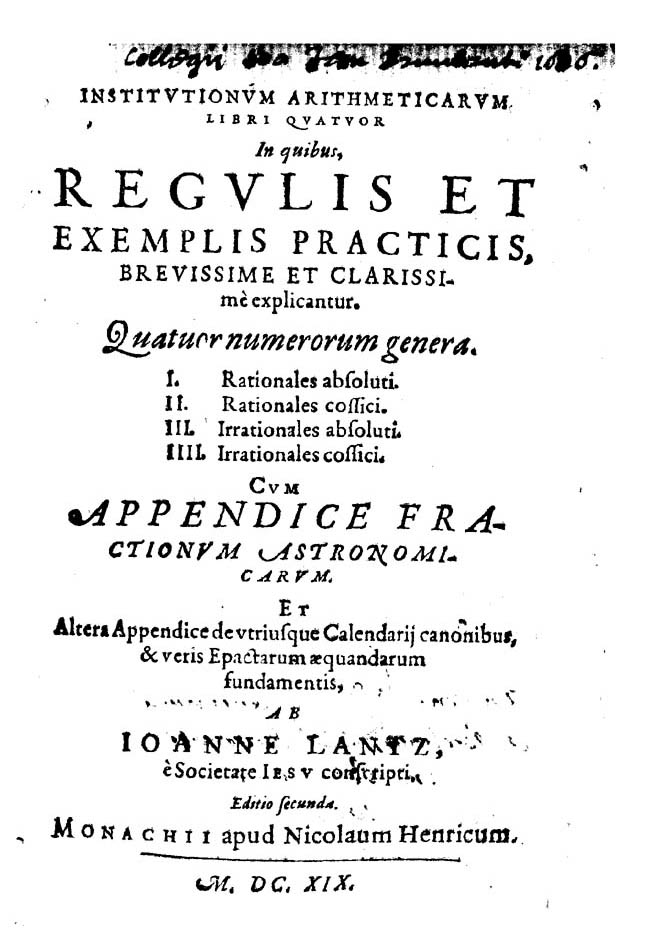
Institutionum arithmeticarum libri quatuor, 1619

Johann Lantz or Lanz (1564 – 20 September 1638) was a German mathematician and Jesuit.

== Biography ==
Born in Tettnang on Lake Constance in 1564, he was admitted as novice in Landsberg in 1589. He became a professor of Hebrew at the University of Ingolstadt. After 1609-1610 he left his place to his pupil Christoph Scheiner and moved to Munich, where he died in 1638.

He wrote several works on mathematics. He analyzed the four genres of numbers, then the astronomic fractions. He is remembered also by Mario Bettini in his Aerarium philosophiae mathematicae (1648).

== Works ==
- Lantz, Johann (1619). Institutionum arithmeticarum libri quatuor (in Latin). Monachii: Nikolaus Heinrich.
