= Gregory of Valencia =

Spanish Jesuit

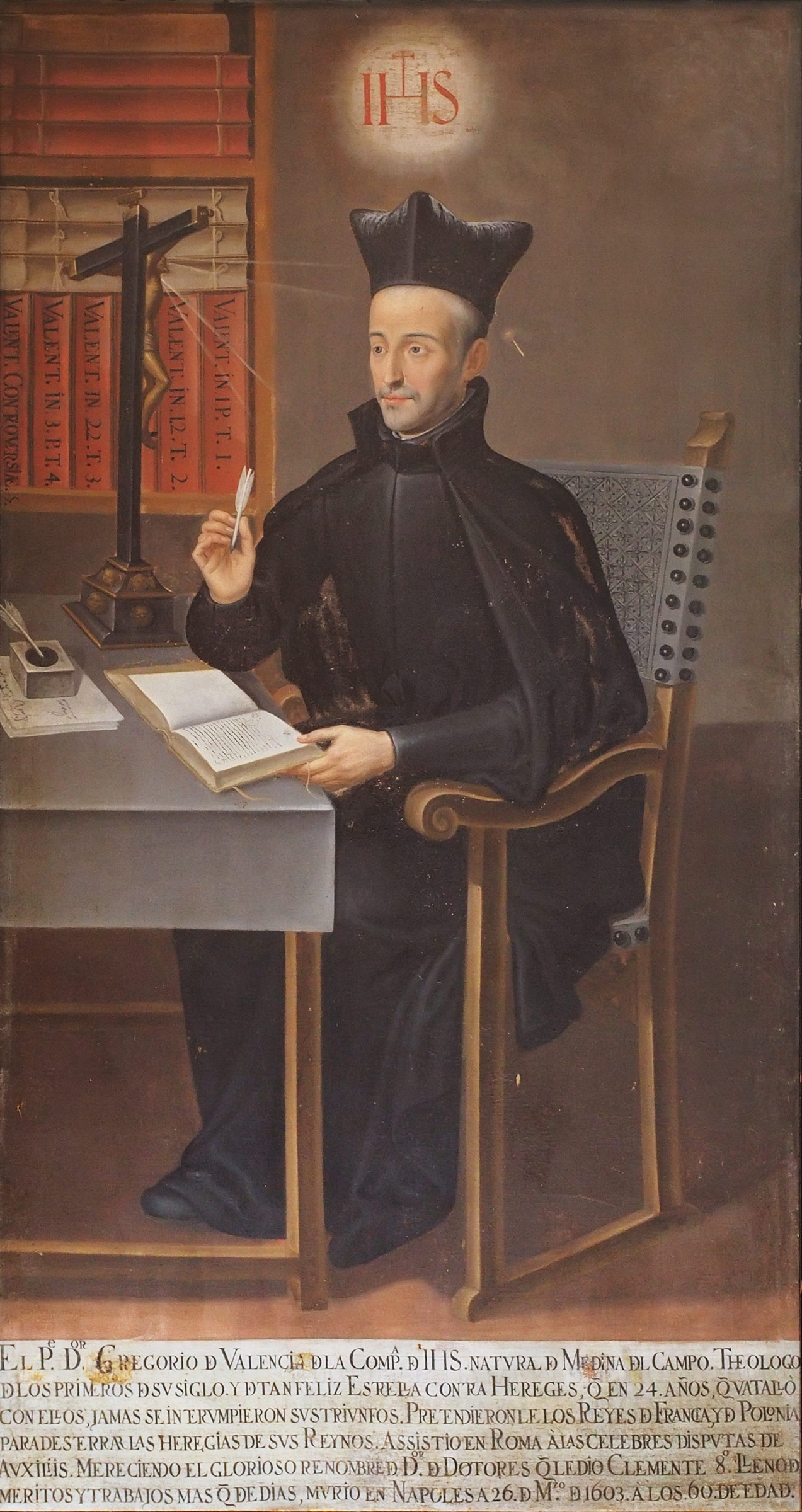
Gregory of Valencia

Gregory of Valencia (Spanish: Gregorio de Valencia) (c. 1550 – 25 April 1603) was a Spanish humanist and scholar who was a professor at the University of Ingolstadt.

== Life ==
Gregory of Valencia was born in Medina del Campo around 1549–50. He received his Bachelor of Arts from the University of Salamanca, where he undertook the Jesuit novitiate in 1565. In 1567, he went on to study theology at Salamanca, where through his instructor, Mancio, he became interested in the theological renewal movement initiated by Francisco de Vitoria. He studied theology at Valladolid (1568–1571). In 1571, he was called by St. Francis Borgia, superior general of the Jesuit order, to teach philosophy in Rome. There he was ordained a priest. He continued his studies at Salamanca (1572).

Gregory of Valencia was appointed professor at the University of Dillinguen (1573–1574), and at Ingolstadt (1575–1597), where he taught scholastic theology. He was a member of the Jesuit College of Ingolstadt while teaching at the University of Ingolstadt. He then became professor and director of the Jesuit College in Rome (1598) at the request of Pope Clement VIII. In 1600, he defended the doctrine of the Spanish theologian Luis de Molina on grace and predestination before the Roman Curia. He wrote a work in four volumes, covering the whole field of scholastic theology. He held the position of prefect of studies in the Collegio Romano until, broken in health through incessant work, he died at Naples on 25 March 1603. Pope Clement VIII honored him with the title of Doctor doctorum.

== Work ==
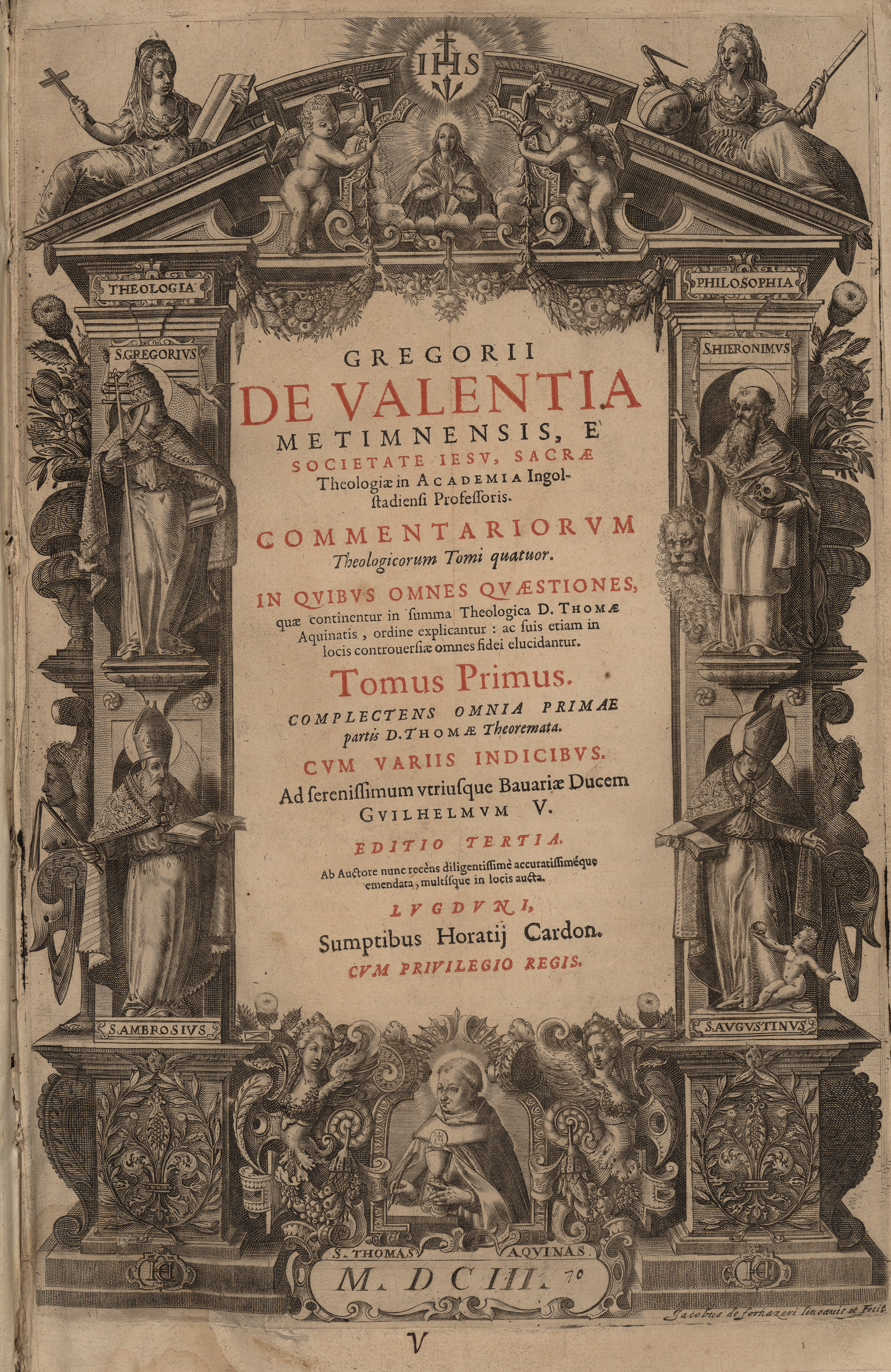
Commentarii theologici, 1603.

Gregory's work is characterised by a renewed Scholasticism in which natural reason is employed to delve deeper into preexisting theological sources. His magnum opus, the Theological Commentaries, employs the method of Francisco de Vitoria to comment on the Summa of Thomas Aquinas.

Apart from various works of controversy and several apologies and speeches, his main doctrinal treatises are:

- Analysis fidei Catholicae (1585)
- Libri quinque de Trinitate (1586)
- De reali Christi praesentia in eucharistia... libri tres (1587)
- De rebus fidei hoc tempore controversis libri (1591)
- Commentariorum theologicorum tomi quatuor. In quibus omnes materiae quae continetur in Summa Divi Thomae explicantur (1591–1597)
