= Johann Heinrich Schönfeld =

German painter in the Baroque style (1609-1684)

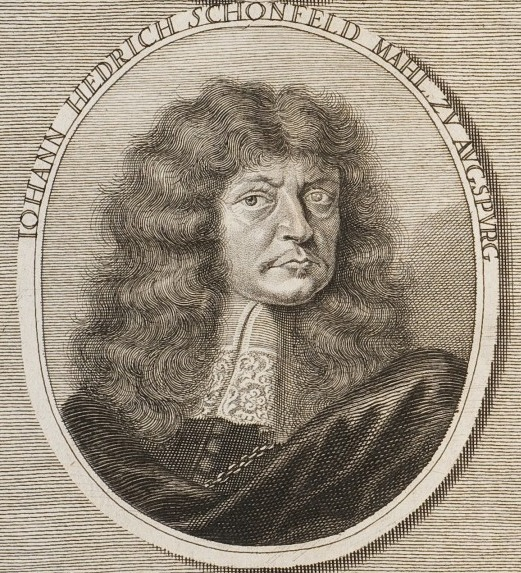
- Portrait by Joachim von Sandrart
- Born: 23 March 1609; Biberach an der Riss
- Died: 1684 (aged 74–75); Augsburg

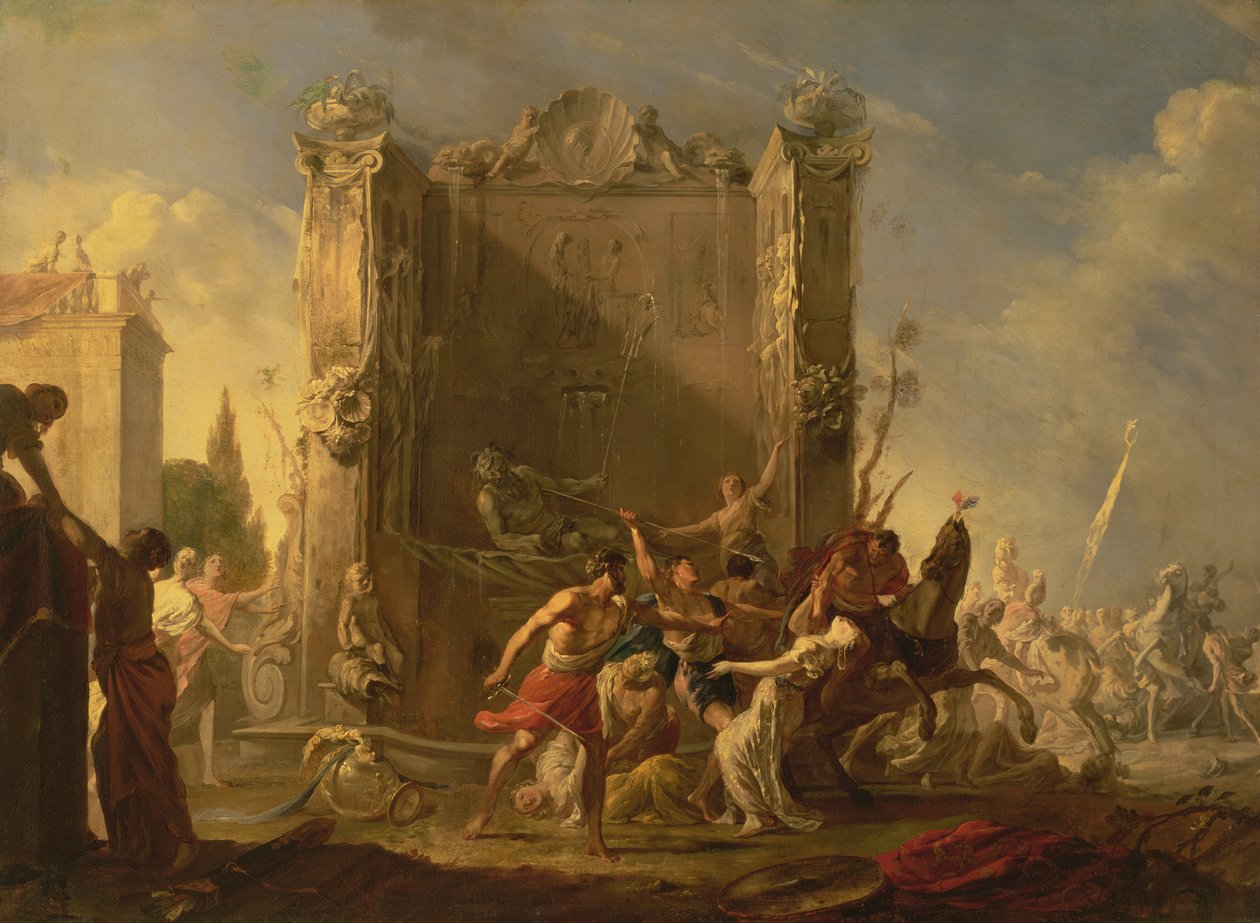
Death of the Daughter of Spurius Tarpeus, c.1640.

Johann Heinrich Schönfeld (23 March 1609 – 1684) was a German painter in the Baroque style.

== Biography ==
He was the son of Johann Baptist Schönfeld (died 1635), a goldsmith. From birth, he was blind in his left eye and could only use his right hand for simple tasks, so he was not trained as a goldsmith, as would have otherwise been the case. Instead, he received lessons in painting from Caspar Sichelbein in Memmingen. Later, he took study trips to Stuttgart and Basel.

In 1633, at the height of the Thirty Years' War, he fled to Italy. Originally, he lived in Rome, then moved to Naples around 1649. After a brief stay in Dresden he returned home in 1651. The following year, in Pfuhl (near Ulm) he married Anna Elisabetha Strauß. They had eight children together. Shortly after their marriage, they moved to Augsburg, where he became a citizen and a member of the Master's Guild.

In the following years, he created many church paintings; notably at Würzburg Cathedral, where he painted Christ carrying the Cross and a likeness of Saint Leonard of Noblac. Both paintings burned during the bombing of Würzburg in World War II. In addition to religious works, he painted mythological and genre scenes.

One of his best-known students was Johann Schmidtner.
