= Perlachturm =

Belltower, Augsburg, Germany

Coordinates: 48.369°N 10.898°E

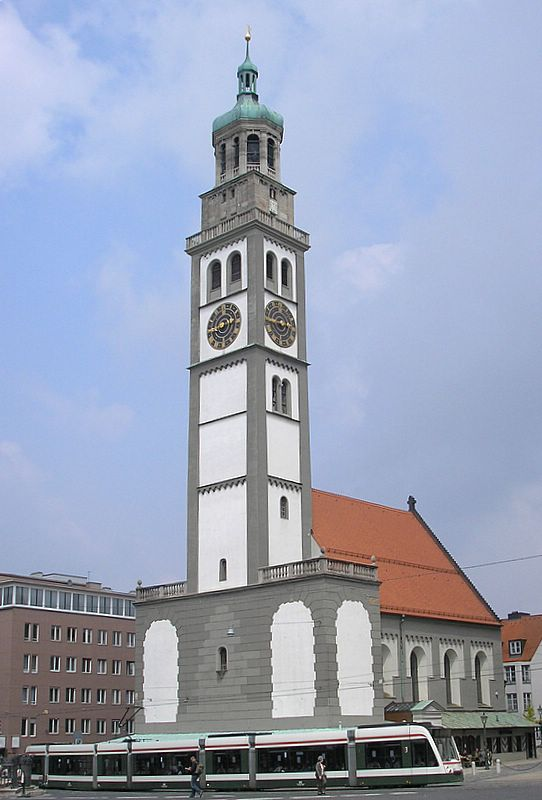
Perlachturm with St. Peter by Perlach

The 70-metre-tall Perlachturm is a belltower in front of the church of St. Peter am Perlach in the central district of Augsburg, Germany. It originated as a watchtower in the 10th century. The existing Renaissance structure was built in the 1610s by Elias Holl, who also designed the neighbouring Town Hall.

== Name ==
The exact origin of the name "Perlachturm" is unknown, with several different theories attempting to explain it. Of the three constituent parts of the name, "Per," "lach" and "turm," only the latter presents no controversy and means "Tower." The conventional wisdom holds that the first two parts originated from the medieval fairs involving bears on the central square. In Old High German, Per means bear and lach describes a show, or fair. An information plaque on the tower itself says that it came from the Latin "perlego" ("read through"). There are 258 steps to the observation deck.

== Gallery ==
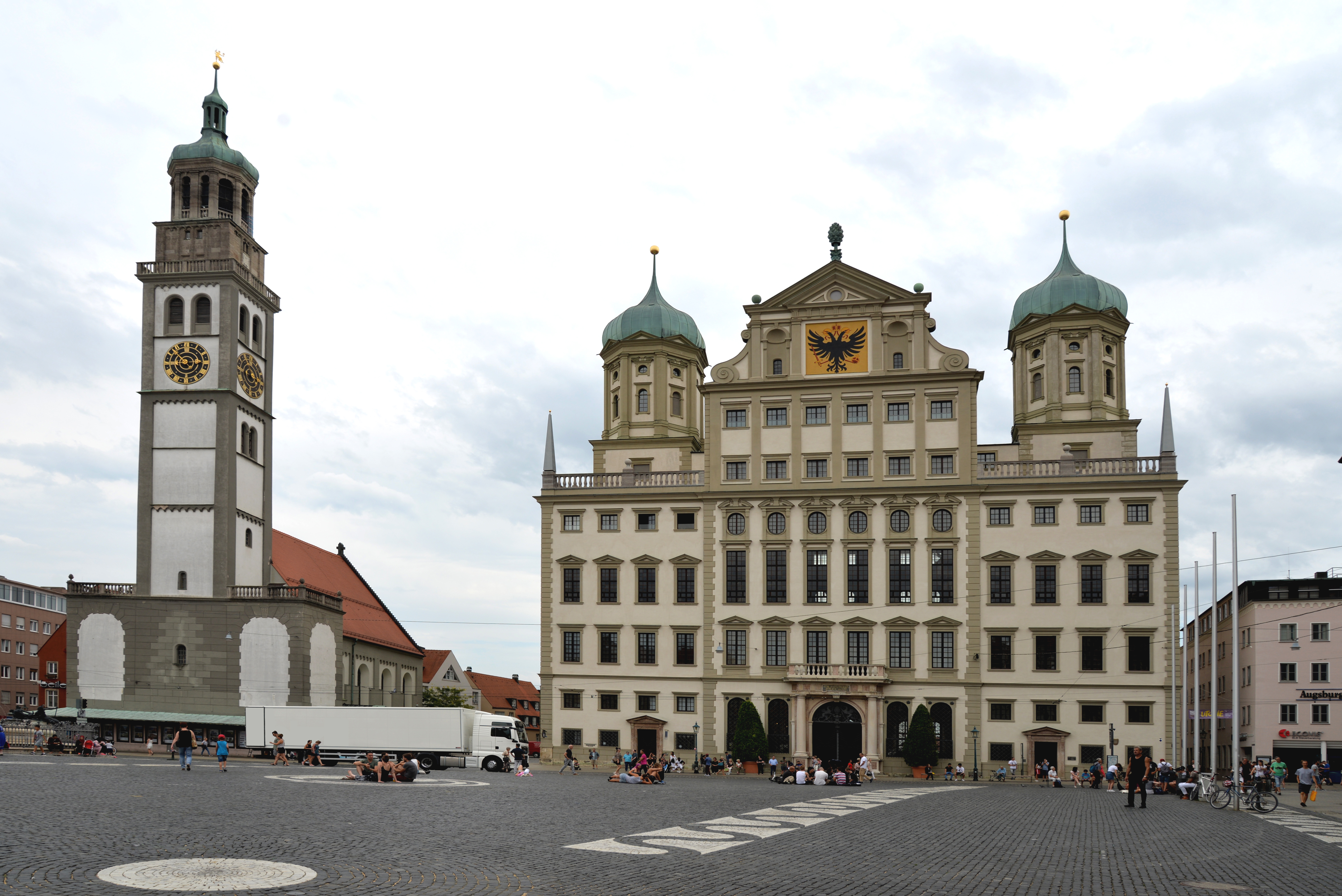
Perlachtower with Town Hall

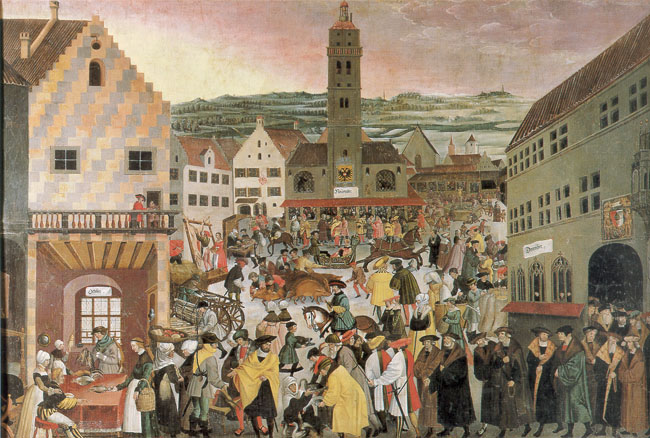
Perlach market place 1550

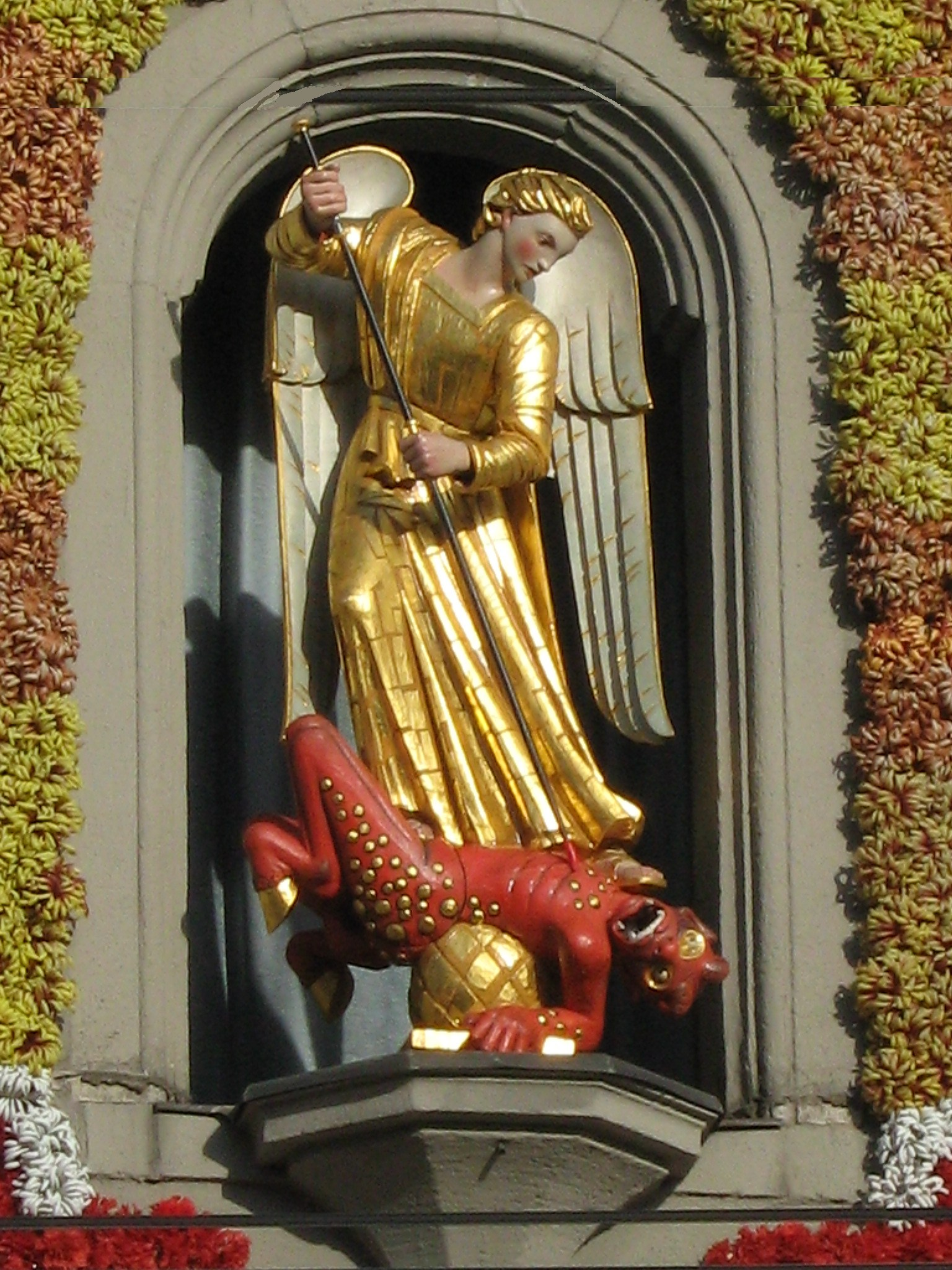
Fighting Turamichele at the window of Perlachturm

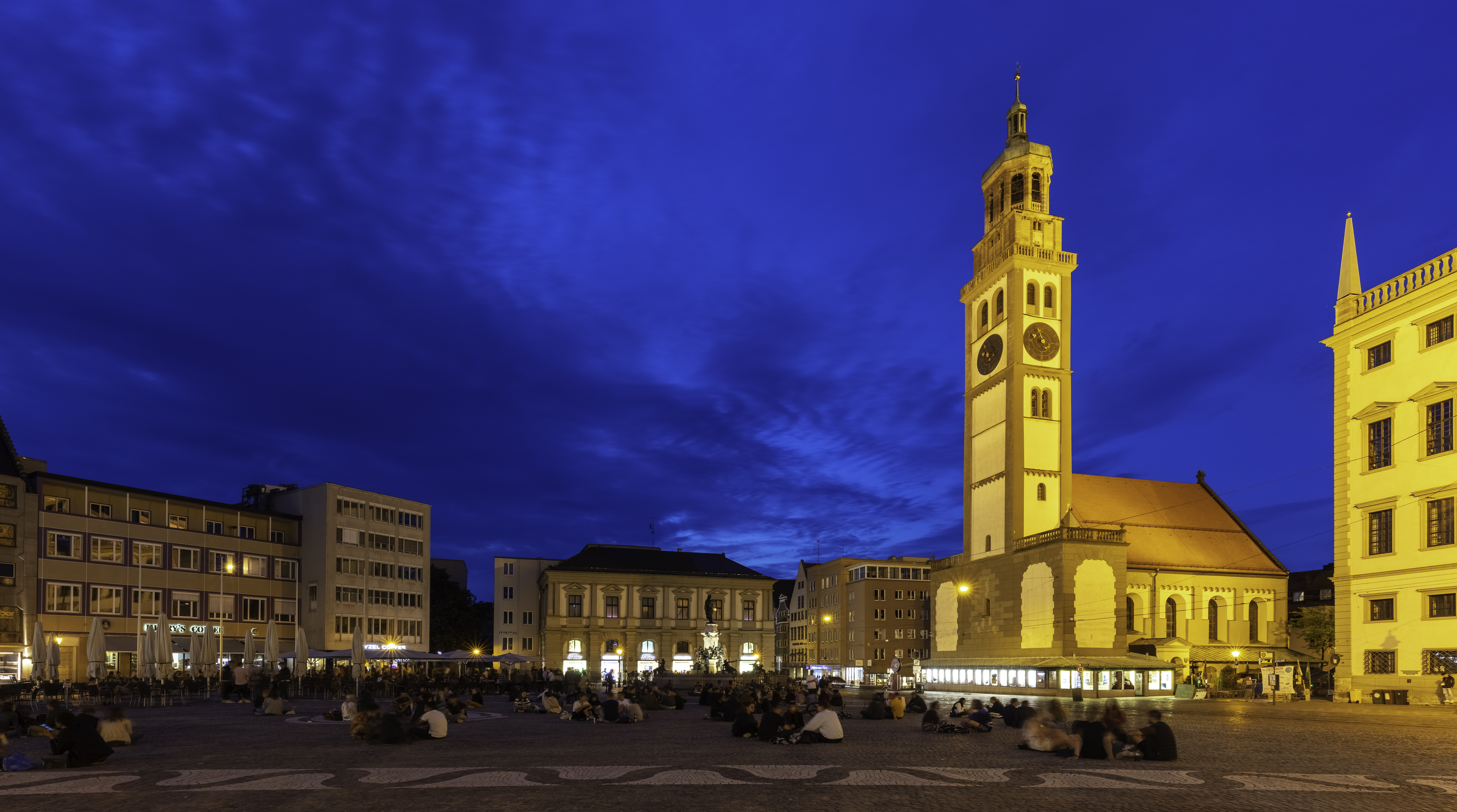
Night view

== See also ==
- Turamichele (fighting Archangel Michael at Perlachturm)
- Mary Untier of Knots in St. Peter am Perlach
- 16th-century Western domes
