= WFI – Ingolstadt School of Management =

Coordinates: 48.765°N 11.416°E

WFI - Ingolstadt School of Management
- Motto: "klein - fein - anspruchsvoll"
- Type: Private University, Private Business School
- Established: 1989
- Dean: Prof. Dr. Jörg Althammer
- Administrative staff: ca. 100; 23 Professors
- Students: ca. 900
- Location: Ingolstadt, Bavaria, Germany
- Colours
- Website: www.wfi.edu
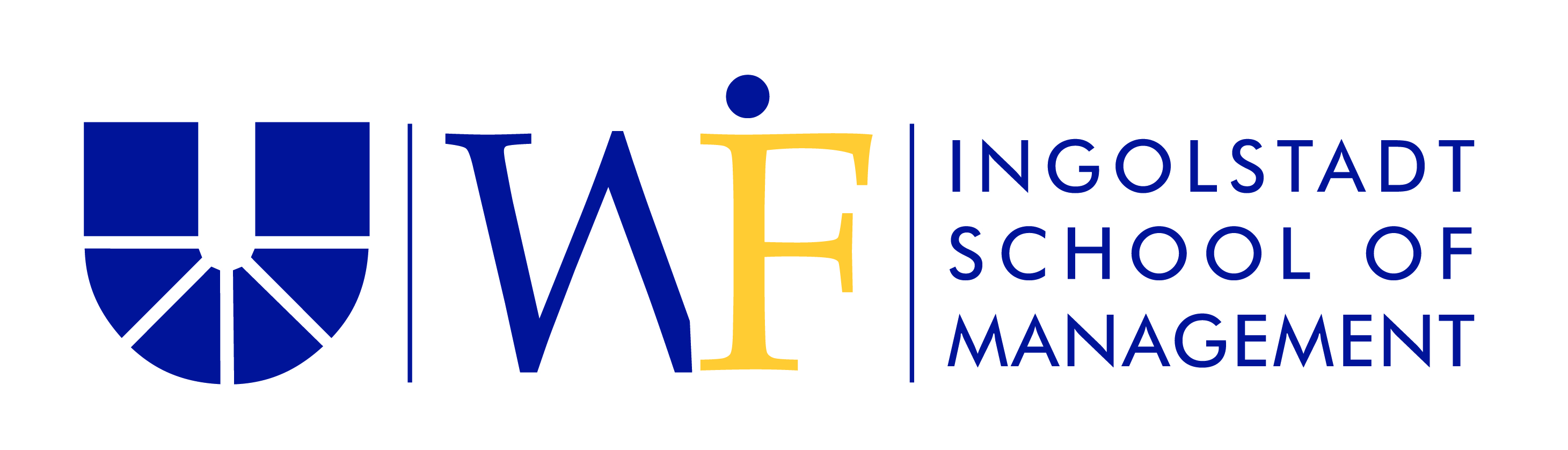

The WFI – Ingolstadt School of Management (or WFI Ingolstadt) is a leading German business school and the faculty of business administration and economics of the Catholic University of Eichstätt-Ingolstadt. The WFI (meaning "Wirtschaftswissenschaftliche Fakultät Ingolstadt" ) is one of Germany's foremost business schools and the modern successor of Bavaria's first university, i.e. the ancient University of Ingolstadt. It is also Germany's only Catholic business school and specifically marked with compulsory courses in economic and business ethics and an obligatory choice of a foreign commercial language course.

== History ==
From 1472 to 1800 the University of Ingolstadt had its seat in Ingolstadt before it moved to Landshut and later to Munich and is still existing as LMU Munich. In the early 1980s, in order to continue the city's tradition of higher education combined with the ambitions of the Catholic University of Eichstaett to diversify the offered portfolio of courses, the city and the university started negotiations about the establishment of a faculty of economics on a second campus of the university in Ingolstadt. The negotiations culminated in the start of teaching in the autumn of 1989 at the new founded business faculty which from then on made public appearance as WFI - Ingolstadt School of Management.

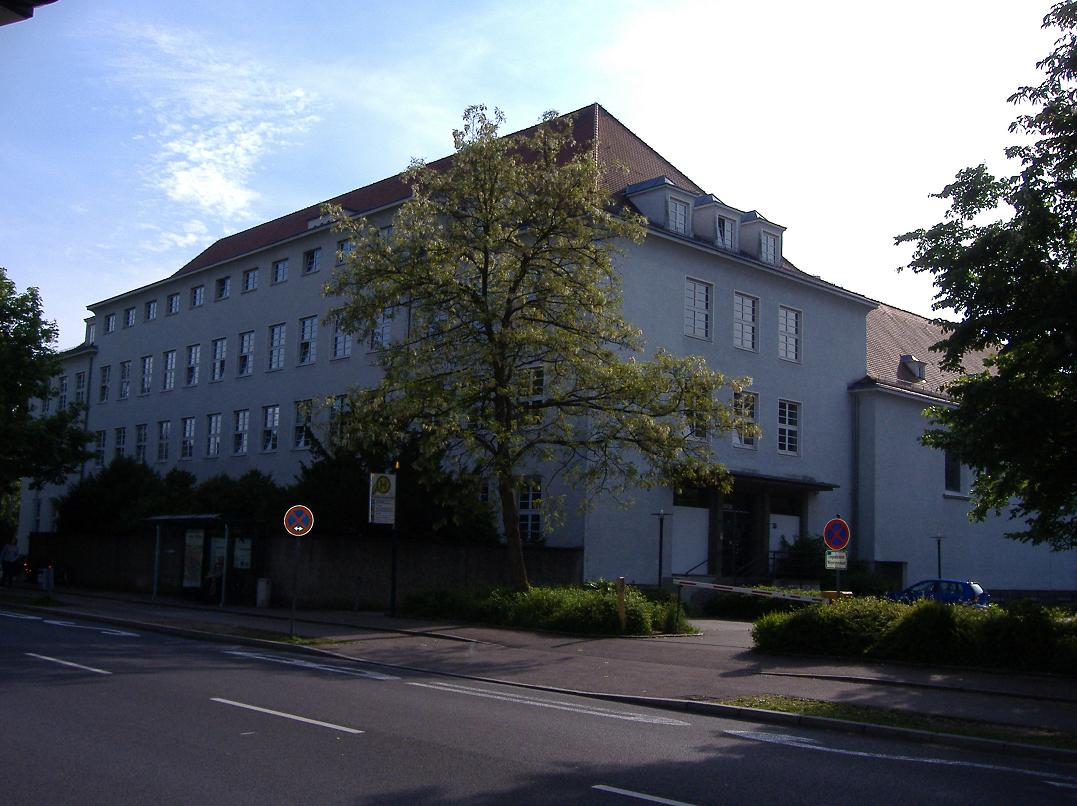
Main building of the WFI

The main cluster of campus buildings of the faculty, including the library (which is a European Documentation Centre) and the big lecture hall, were in former times a monastery of the Divine Word Missionaries, but it was soon to small for the increasing numbers of students. Therefore, the decision was made to expand the existing faculty with a new building on campus, which was finished in 1995, when already around 750 students were enrolled at the WFI.

In 1997 the first chair of Service Management in Germany was introduced at the WFI – Ingolstadt School of Management.

== Reputation ==
The WFI has a reputation of being one of the best academic institutions for management education in Germany as its corporate relations and major rankings (9th nationally, 2nd in Bavaria) confirm.

== Selection process ==
Since 1996 the WFI uses a double-stage selection process for university applicants in order to assess their potential. Applicants are preselected on the basis of their academic and personal achievements as well as their extracurricular activities and social commitment. During an interview day potential students have to put their intellectual skills to the test and are asked to explain their motivation to become a part of the WFI academic community. This takes place in front of a jury of professors, research fellows and further members of the school.

== Degree programmes ==
The WFI offers the following degree programmes:

- Bachelor of Science (B.Sc.) in Business Administration (three-year-programme offering nine areas of specialisation).
- Bachelor of Science (B.Sc.) and Bachelor of Business Management (BBM) in International Business Administration (four-year-programme leading to a German-Chinese double degree) in cooperation with the Tongji University (Shanghai) and the Sun Yat-sen University (Guangzhou).
- Master of Science (M.Sc.) in Business Administration (two-year-programme with specialisations in the areas of Management, Finance and Management Science).
- Master of Science (M.Sc.) in International Business Administration (two-year-programme leading to a German-French double degree) in cooperation with ESC Toulouse.
- Master of Business Administration (M.B.A.).
- Doctoral programmes leading to the German PhD equivalent Dr. rer. pol.

== International partner universities ==
As internationality is one of the major aspirations of the WFI – Ingolstadt School of Management, it has own partner universities in addition to the partners of the Catholic University of Eichstätt-Ingolstadt. A small selection:

University	City	Nation
St. Edward's University	Austin, Texas	United States
Stellenbosch University	Stellenbosch	South Africa
Tongji University	Shanghai	PRC
Sun Yat-sen University	Guangzhou	PRC
Xiamen University	Xiamen	PRC
Loyola Institute of Business Administration	Chennai	India
ITESO	Guadalajara	Mexico
Rajagiri Centre for Business Studies	Kochi	India
Saint Petersburg State University of Economics and Finance	St. Petersburg	Russia
Higher School of Economics	Moscow	Russia
Katholieke Universiteit Leuven	Leuven	Belgium
Hanken School of Economics	Helsinki / Vaasa	Finland
ESC Toulouse	Toulouse / Barcelona	France / Spain
EDHEC Business School	Lille / Nice	France
Regent's College London	London	United Kingdom
University College Dublin	Dublin	Ireland
Freie Universität Bozen	Bolzano	Italy
Università Cattolica del Sacro Cuore	Milan	Italy
Università degli Studi di Modena e Reggio nell’Emilia	Modena / Reggio Emilia	Italy
Vilnius Gediminas Technical University	Vilnius	Lithuania
Warsaw School of Economics	Warsaw	Poland
Comenius University	Bratislava	Slovakia
Universidad de Salamanca	Salamanca	Spain
Universidad de Sevilla	Seville	Spain
Corvinus University	Budapest	Hungary
