= San José del Talar =

Church in Buenos Aires, Argentina

Coordinates: 34°35′29″S 58°29′24″W

San José del Talar is a church in Buenos Aires in Argentina.

Church and parish (Parroquia San Jose del Talar) are located in Calle Navarro 2460, 1419 Ciudad De Buenos Aires (Agronomía).

== Mary Untier of Knots ==
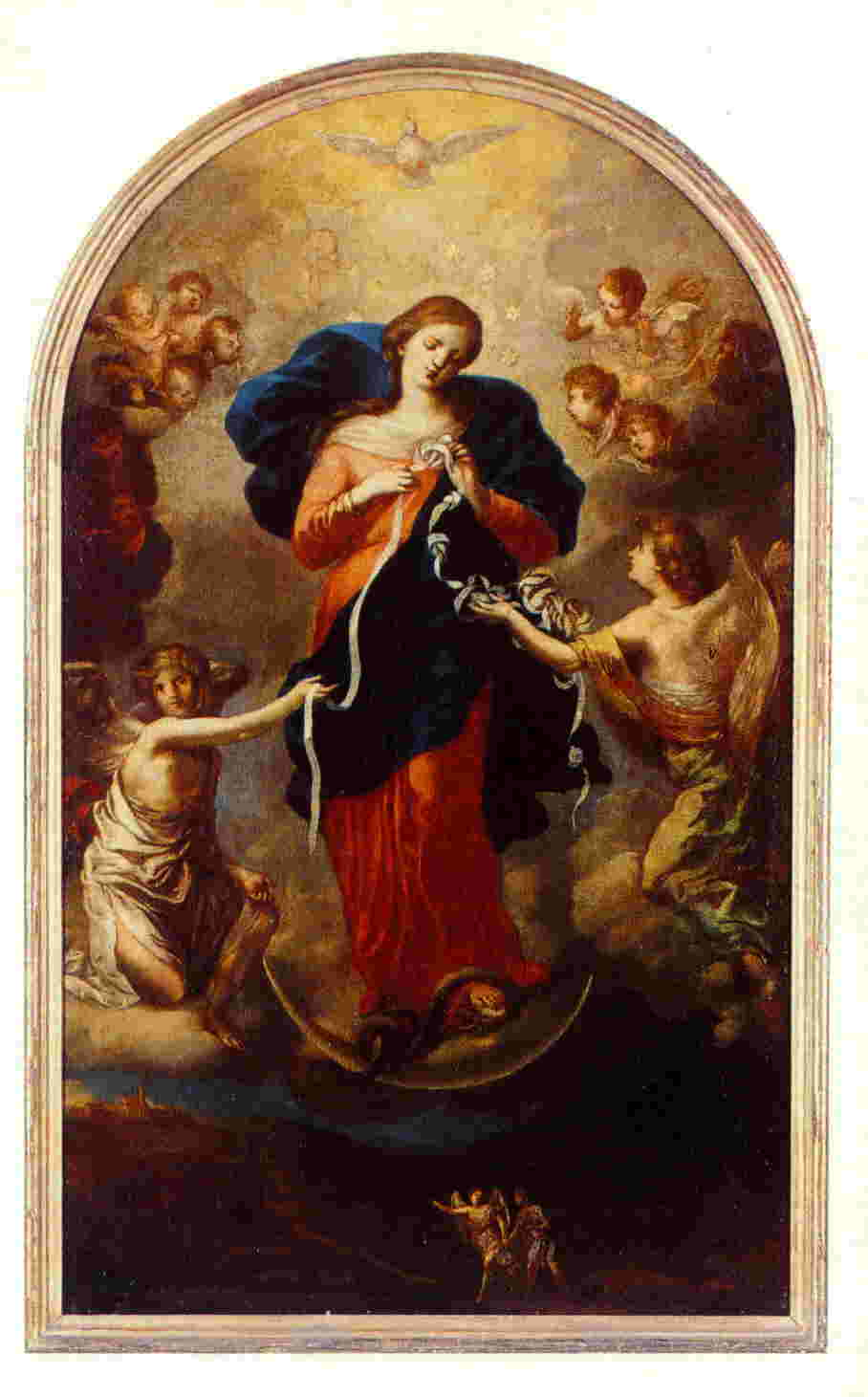
Mary Untier of Knots

In this church is a miraculous image of Mary Untier of Knots, visited every 8th of the month by thousands of pilgrims. The picture found the way from St. Peter am Perlach in Augsburg to Buenos Aires by the Jesuit Jorge Mario Bergoglio (Pope Francis).
