= Jakob Rem =

Austrian Jesuit (1546-1618)

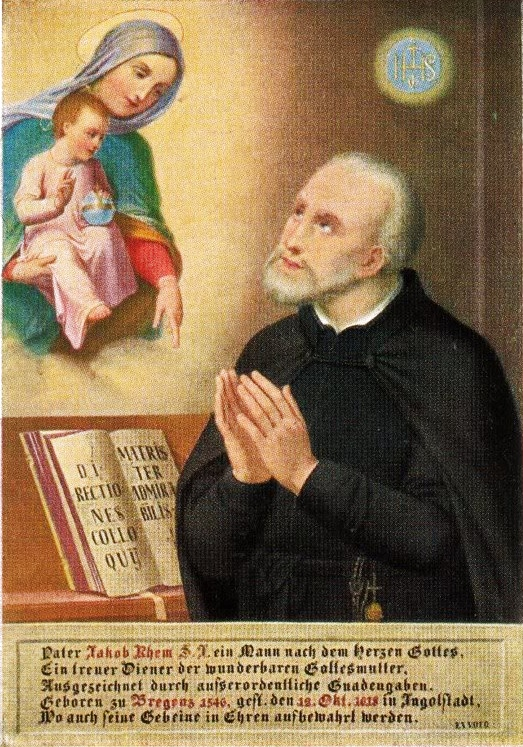
- Jakob Rem votive (1850)
- Born: June 1546; Bregenz, Austria
- Died: 12 October 1618 (aged 72); Ingolstadt, Bavaria
- Occupation: Jesuit
- Known for: Mater ter admirabilis

Jakob Rem (June 1546 - 12 October 1618) was an Austrian member of the Society of Jesus, a Catholic evangelical organization, and an early member of the Congregation of Marian Fathers.

== Career ==
Jakob Rem was born in June 1546 in Bregenz, Austria. (Note: The Allgemeine Deutsche Biographie considers that Rem was most likely born at Kißlegg rather than Bregenz.) In 1556 his family moved to Dillingen an der Donau, Bavaria. He studied at the Jesuit secondary school in Dillingen. Soon after starting his university studies in 1566 he asked for admission to the Jesuit order. He was sent to Rome, and on 18 September 1566 began his first novitiate. In Rome he met the Jesuit leaders Peter Canisius and Francis Borgia. He was a fellow student of Stanislaus Kostka and Claudio Acquaviva. While in Rome Jakob Rem came to know of the Sodality of Our Lady, a Marian society that had been founded there a few years earlier.

After completing his novitiate, in the autumn of 1568 Jakob Rem returned to Dillingen, where he studied philosophy. He earned a master's degree a year later, and then studied theology. He was ordained a priest in 1573 in Augsburg. He held his first mass on 21 May 1573. On 13 November 1574 he founded a Marian congregation in Dillingen dedicated to the Assumption of Mary. This was the first Marian Congregation in Southern Germany. In 1582 he became chancellor of Jesuit seminary at Dillingen. In 1584 Rem moved to the Jesuit College in Munich, and in 1585 was made prefect in the local Jesuit seminary of Saint Michael.

Jakob Rem became chancellor of the Jesuit Seminary at Ingolstadt in 1586, a position he would hold until his death. He was exceptional for his renunciation of worldly things, for ecstasies, visions and prophecies.

On 4 May 1595 Jakob Rem founded the Colloquium Marianum during the dedication of a new altar at the Jesuit College of Ingolstadt. The image of the Virgin was placed above the altar The Colloquium Marianum became an elite movement that included many of the leaders of the Counter Reformation.

Jakob Rem gained a high reputation for his intelligence, wisdom and piety. He died at Ingolstadt on 12 October 1618.

== Beatfication process ==
Only 27 years after his death, the first steps towards Rem's beatification were taken. The episcopal information process for beatification was started again on 26 March 1934, granting Rem the title of Servant of God; it was completed in 1949. Bishop Gregor Maria Hanke ordered the reopening of the beatification process in 2010.

== Mater ter admirabilis ==
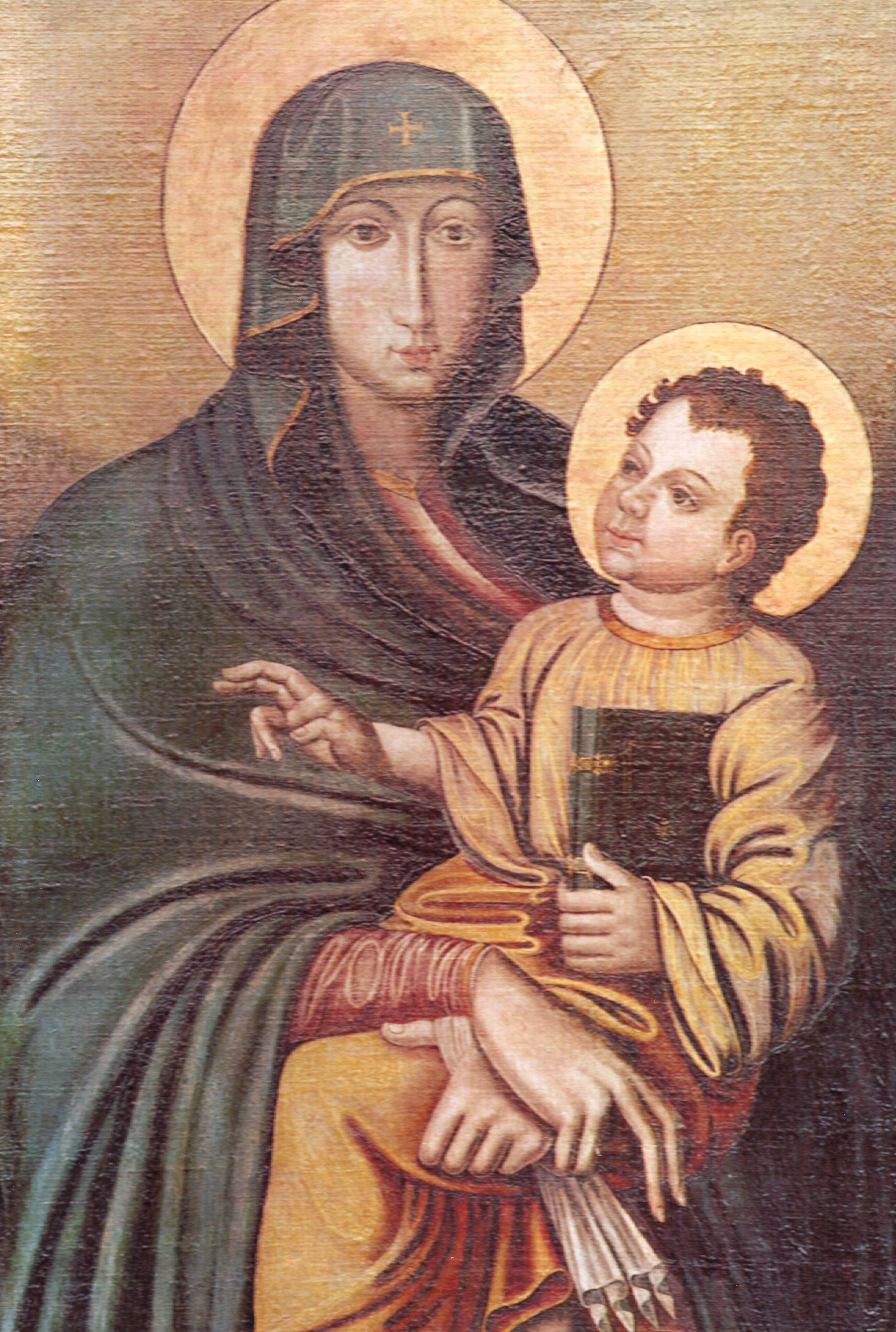
The icon Mater ter admirabilis

Around 1570 Francis Borgia, Superior General of the Jesuits, gave the Jesuit College of Ingolstadt a copy of the icon Salus Populi Romani, also called Maria Schnee (Our Lady of the Snow) depicting the Virgin and Child. The original is in Santa Maria Maggiore in Rome. Ingolstadt received a carefully made copy of the icon. Rem used the picture as a basis for teaching his students devotion of the Virgin.

Jakob Rem came to believe that the invocation "Mother admirable" in the Litany of Loreto summarized all that could be said about the Mother of God. On 6 April 1604, according to a Jesuit chronicle, the Virgin Mary confirmed this in a vision to Father Jakob. He was moved to ask the choir to repeat the phrase Mater admirablis three times to please the Virgin. This repetition became a set part of the litany of the Colloquists. The icon was given the name Mater ter admirabilis after the miraculous event, and became the focus for Marian devotion in the college. It was used during the Counter-Reformation as justification of the cult of images.

The icon is now kept at the Münster Zur SchönenUnsere Lieben Frau in Ingolstadt.

== Mary, Untier of Knots ==
Rem is credited with the Marian devotion of Mary, Untier of Knots. In 1612 the nobleman Wolfgang Langenmantel (1568-1637) came to Ingolstadt to seek Rem's advice about his marriage, which was on the verge of breakdown. He met with Rem four times. On the last visit, after Rem had been praying in front of the painting of the Mater ter admirabilis, Rem took Wolfgang's wedding ribbon and solemnly untied the wedding knots, smoothing out the ribbon, which became intensely white. Wolfgang felt that this symbolized the solution of his marital problems, and returned to his wife.
