= Biburg Abbey =

Monastery in Bavaria, Germany

Coordinates: 48°47′32″N 11°51′24″E

Biburg Abbey (German: Kloster Biburg) was a Benedictine monastery located at Biburg in Bavaria, Germany.

== History ==
The monastery, dedicated to the Virgin Mary, was founded in 1132 by Konrad and Arbo von Sittling-Biburg, sons of the Blessed Berta of Biburg, who gave their castle to the Bishop of Bamberg for the purpose. The foundation was originally a double monastery for both men and women; the nunnery however burnt down in 1258 and was not re-built.

In 1555 the monastery was dissolved and the premises came into lay hands. In 1589 the Jesuit College of Ingolstadt obtained the buildings, which were taken over in 1781 by the Knights Hospitaller. In 1808 the monastery was secularised and passed into the possession of the Bavarian State.

== See also ==
- List of Jesuit sites
