= Catholic University of Eichstätt-Ingolstadt =

Roman Catholic research university in Bavaria, Germany

- Katholische Universität Eichstätt-Ingolstadt
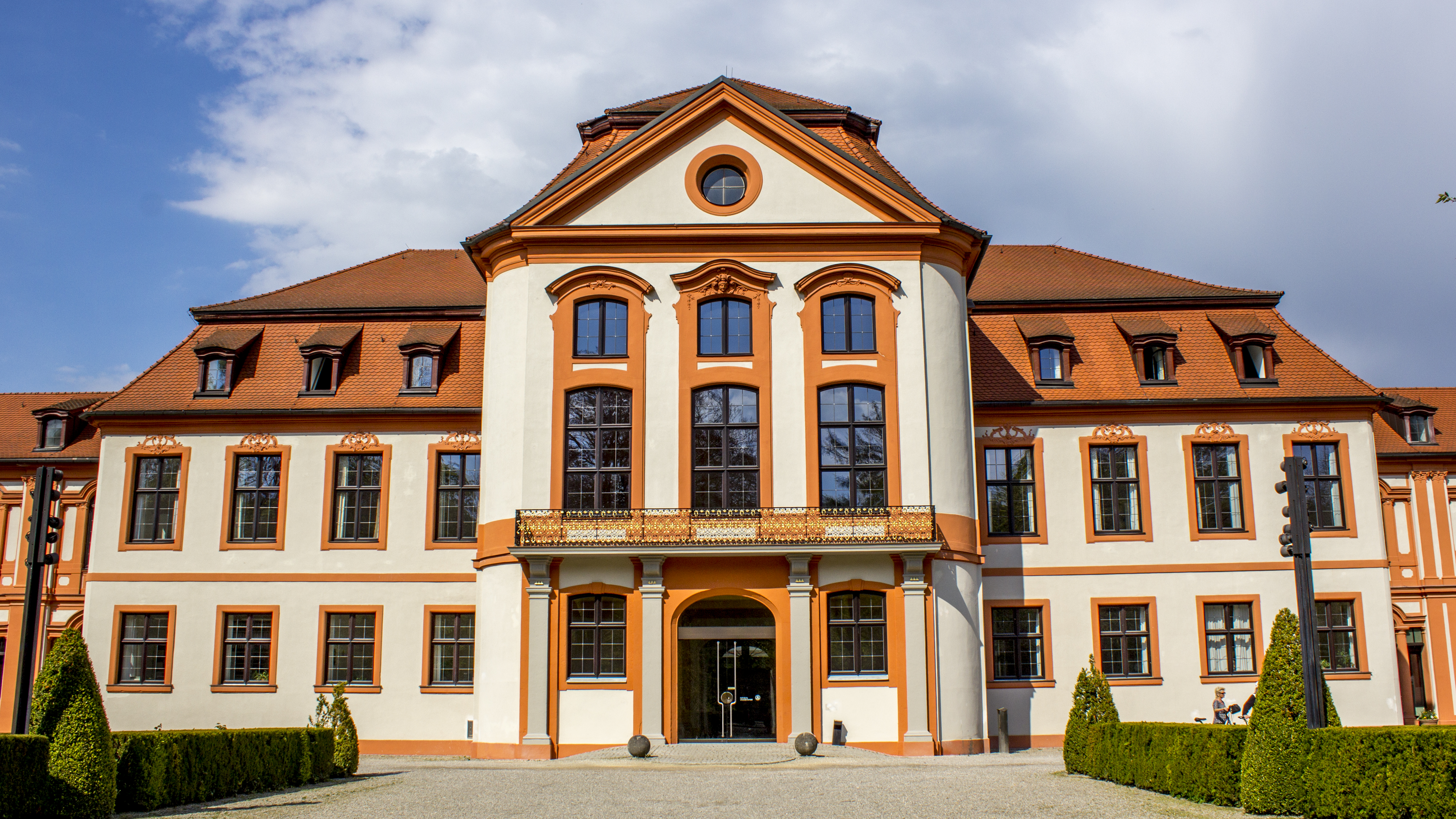
- Main building of the Catholic University of Eichstätt-Ingolstadt
- Type: Catholic
- Established: 1980 (as university)
- President: Gabriele Gien
- Location: Eichstätt & Ingolstadt, Bavaria, Germany; 48°53′22″N 11°11′23″E
- Website: www.ku.de

- Location in Germany Catholic University of Eichstätt-Ingolstadt (Bavaria)

The Katholische Universität Eichstätt-Ingolstadt (KU) is a Catholic research university in Eichstätt and Ingolstadt, Bavaria, Germany. It is the only Catholic university in Germany.

Compared to other German universities it is a rather small institution with 4,800 students in 2019; nevertheless, it is the largest non-state university in Germany. The university has its main campus in Eichstätt (the buildings being in the town center or within walking distance) and another (the Ingolstadt School of Management) in Ingolstadt, site of the first Bavarian university in 1472.

== History ==
The university's history dates back to a seminary for priests ("Collegium Willibaldum"), which was founded in 1564 by bishop Martin von Schaumburg and the old University of Ingolstadt, the first university in Bavaria, which was founded in 1472 with the approval of the pope. The latter institution was moved to the capital Munich – nowadays LMU Munich by King Ludwig I in 1826. One of the most famous rectors of the old University of Ingolstadt was the Jesuit Petrus Canisius.

Today's university came into existence in 1980, after a fusion of Eichstätt's School of Education and the School of Philosophy and Theology in 1972. A major role in the formation of the university was played by the former archbishop of Munich-Freising, Joseph Ratzinger, who later got an honorary doctorate from the university. Among others receiving honorary doctorates from the university are the philosopher Karl Popper, and the former bishop of Eichstätt Alois Brems. In 1990, the Catholic University established the WFI – Ingolstadt School of Management, one of Germany's foremost business schools. Since 1998 the Collegium Orientale, an academic institution associated with the university, hosts young theologians and priests from eastern European and Oriental churches who are pursuing their post-graduate studies in Eichstätt.

== Catholic context ==
The university is largely funded by the state but is run by a self-governing public church trust (Stiftung Katholische Universität Eichstätt, Kirchliche Stiftung des Öffentlichen Rechts) set up by Bavarian Catholic bishops on the basis of a concordat between the Holy See and the Free State of Bavaria. The ethos of Catholic universities was defined in Pope John Paul II's Apostolic Constitution of Catholic Churches. The university does not require students or staff to be practicing Catholics.

One source notes the "seven Bavarian bishops increased their financial commitment to the KU for the first time in 2016 to a good 15 million euros annually, which corresponds to around a quarter of the regular budget."

== The CU at a glance ==
The 8 faculties of the Catholic University of Eichstätt-Ingolstadt offer 40 different subjects, with no prominence given to theological study. The CU is fully accredited by the Free State of Bavaria, and is thus equated to German state universities in all respects. For students, personal faith does not play any part in the admission process. The university library has a stock of books exceeding 1.5 million volumes, thus offering students and teaching staff immediate access to books of all areas via an electronic inventory accessible from almost anywhere.

The CU has a teacher-student ratio of 1:15. The portion of international students from Europe and all over the world is very high compared to state universities. Russian, Spanish, French and English are thus very common languages in Eichstätt, many students being fluent in at least 2 of them.

BA and MA integrated degrees are offered, where the students spend only part of their time at the CU, the rest at partner universities. These double or triple degrees offer a possibility to experience the academic environment of more than one country, and are popular choice for undergraduates.

The university has the following faculties:

- Faculty of Catholic Theology
- Faculty of Philosophy and Education
- Faculty of Languages and Literatures
- Faculty of History and Social Sciences
- Faculty of Mathematics and Geography
- Faculty of Business Administration and Economics (in Ingolstadt)

There are also two integrated institutes of Higher Education for:

- Religious Education and Church Educational Work
- Social Work

There are also:

- an Institute for Marriage and the Family in society
- an Institute for Latin American Studies
- an Institute for Central and Eastern European Studies
- a Centre for Interdisciplinary Health Sciences
- a language teaching centre

== Controversies ==
In 2008, there was a struggle over the appointment of the University President, when Gregor Maria Hanke, the Bishop of Eichstätt and ex officio Chancellor, refused to appoint the next President already chosen by the Professoriate, Ulrich Hemel. Two senior academics resigned and an open letter from students and senior professors attacked "unprecedented" church interference. Hanke was relieved of his Chancellor role in 2010 after further conflict with the university, and his job assigned to the head of the Freising Bishops' Conference.

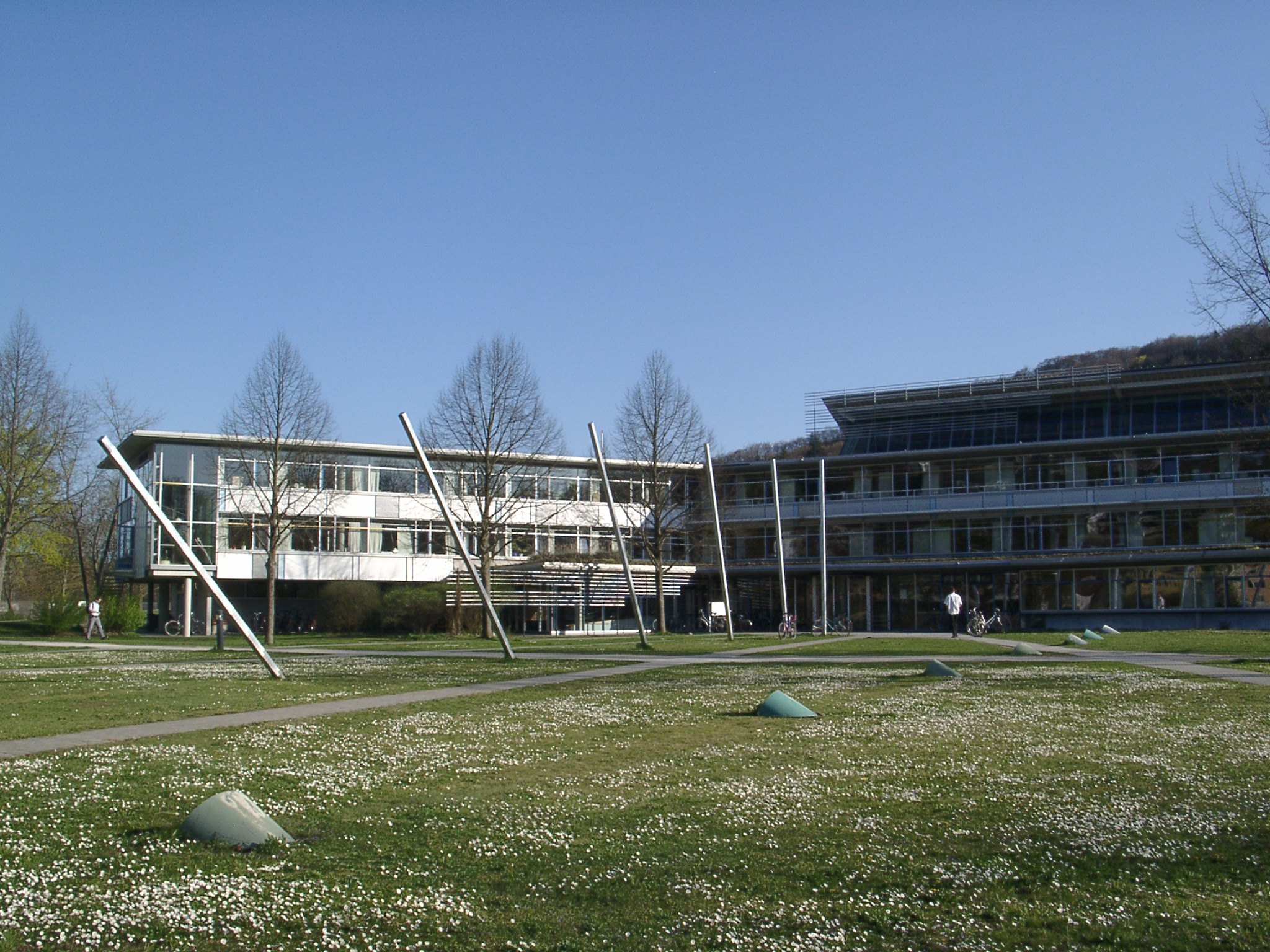
Central Library of the Catholic University of Eichstätt-Ingolstadt

In February 2007 it was revealed that the university library had recycled 80 tons of books and journals, of which 68.4 tons had been donated from the central library in Altötting of the Bavarian Capuchin monasteries. This is about one quarter of the 300,000 volumes of philosophy and theology donated for the purpose of being included in university library's collections. An inquiry ordered by the Government of the Free State of Bavaria concluded that no valuable books had been destroyed.

== Rankings ==
The Faculty of Business in Ingolstadt was and continues to be one of the most competitive business schools in Germany. In 2005, the CU's journalism program was ranked among the five best media and communication programs in Germany.

The university is ranked 1001+ overall in the Times Higher Education World University Rankings, 2024 and in the 401–600th range for its 'impact' It is not in the QS World University Rankings.

Within Germany, in 2024 it was awarded the 'most popular university' by Studycheck, where students rate their experiences. Also, Educheck ranks it 86 of 369 institutions in Germany in 2024, based on research output, reputation, and its top-5 alumni. The highest performance is in Liberal Arts & Social Sciences (75th).
