= Turamichele =

Mechanical figure in Perlach Tower, Germany

Coordinates: 48°22′09″N 10°53′54″E

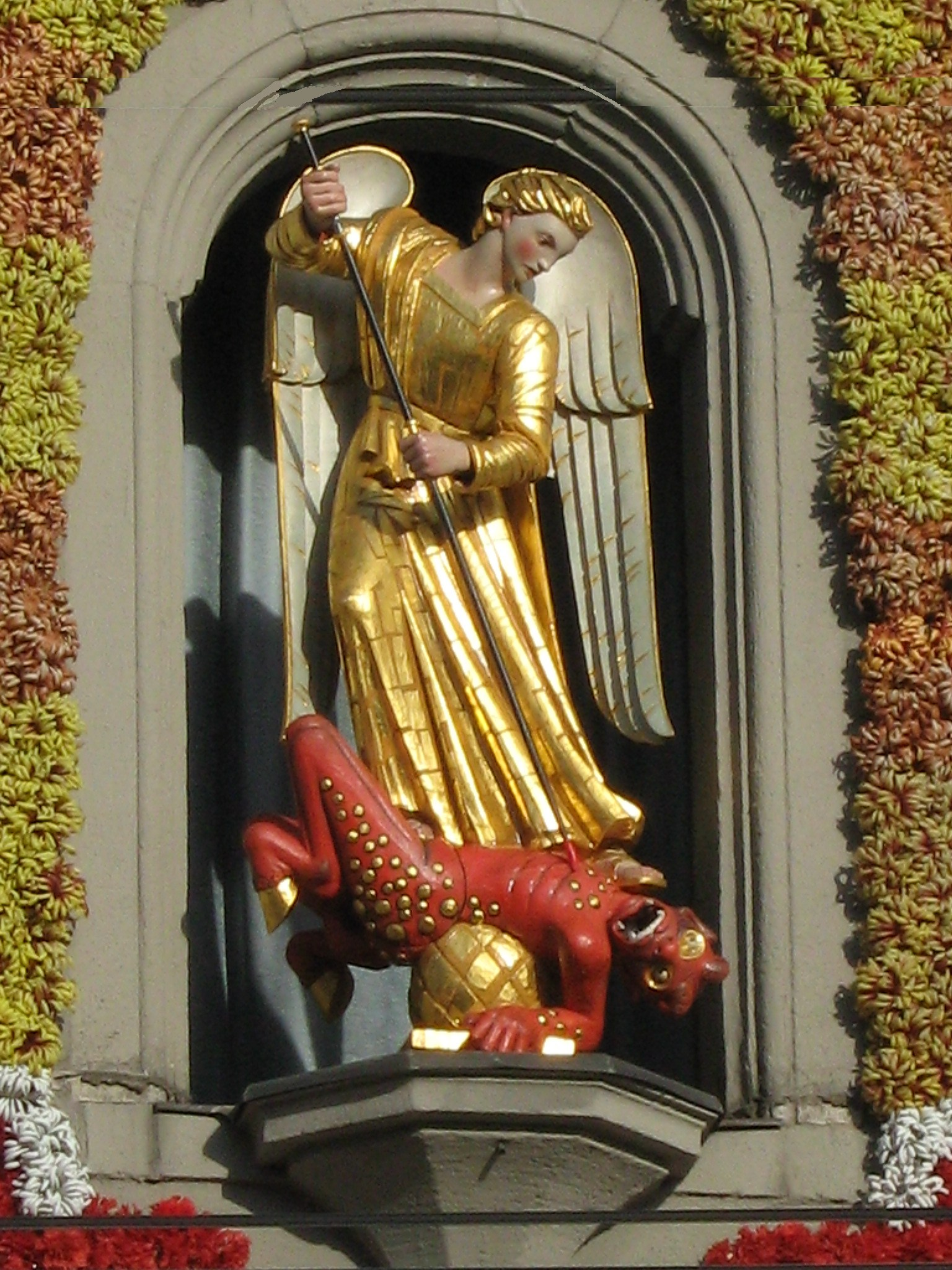
Turamichele in Augsburg - Perlach-Tower

Turamichele ("Tower-Michael") is the name of a moving mechanical figure on the Perlach Tower (Perlachturm) next to Perlach church in Augsburg, Bavaria, Germany. It shows the Archangel Michael fighting with the devil. According to legend, the archangel Michael chased a dragon out of the Augsburg forests a long time ago.

Every year on 29 September (Michaelmas or St. Michael's Day) the Turamichele appears in a window on the west side of the tower. The day is also marked by a big children's party.

== See also ==
- Mary Untier of Knots in Perlach church
