= Mater ter admirabilis =

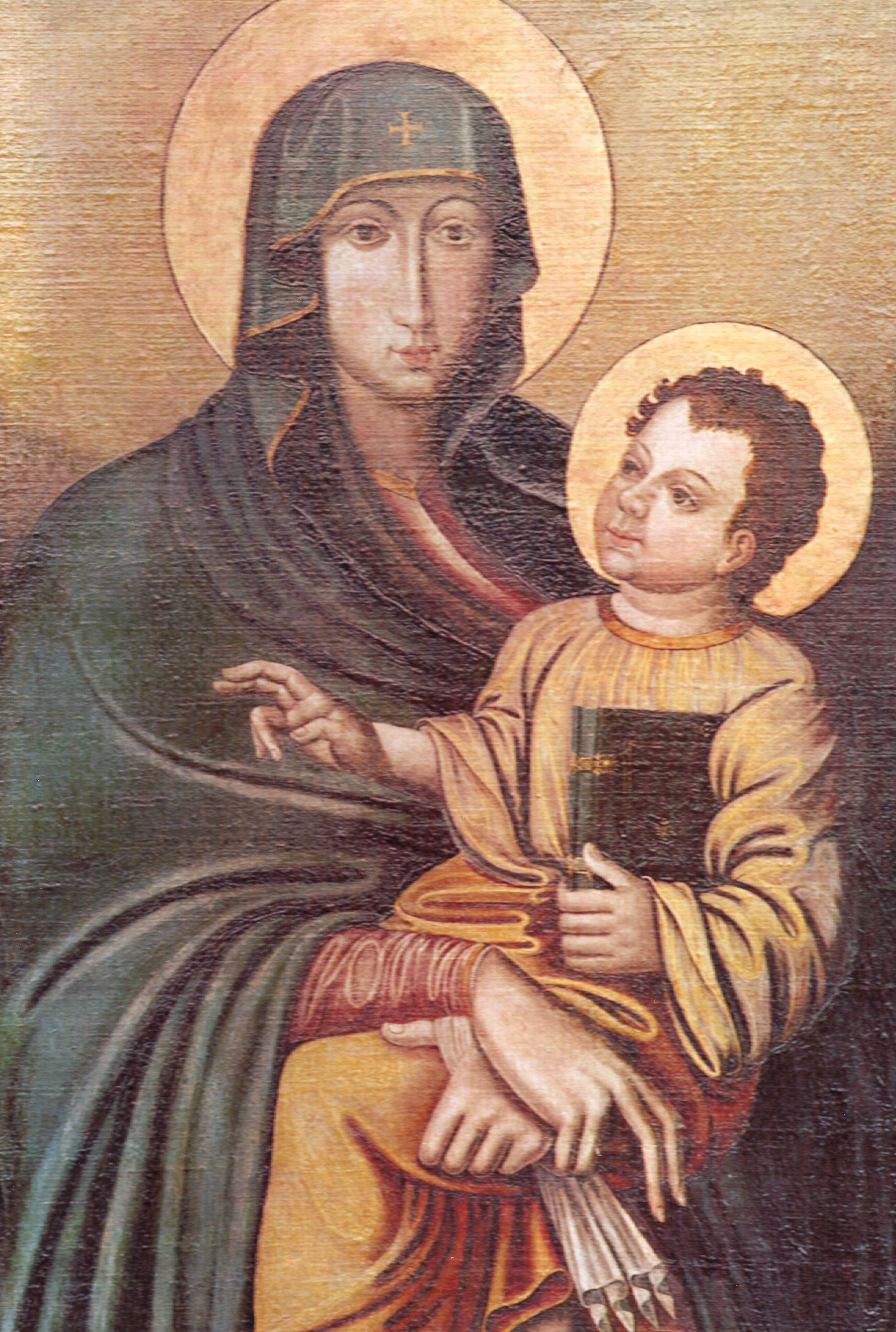
A copy of the icon of Mary "Salus Populi Romani" in the Cappella Paolina in Santa Maria Maggiore, Rome. The copy was a gift from the Jesuit general, Francis Borgia, to the Jesuit College at Ingolstadt.

Mater ter admirabilis, literally "Mother thrice admirable", is a Marian title in Latin given to a miraculous copy of the Salus Populi Romani icon, enshrined at the Münster Zur Schönen Unsere Lieben Frau in Ingolstadt, Bavaria, Germany. The title is a variant of Mater admirabilis (Mother most admirable) from the Litany of Loreto.

== History ==
It was first used by the Jesuit Father Jakob Rem, head of the Sodality of Our Lady, in Ingolstadt, Bavaria on April 6, 1604. The most common litany used nowadays, the Litany of Loreto, uses the invocation Mater admirabilis, which means "Mother admirable".

On April 6, 1604, the Colloquium Marianum of the Jesuit Sodality at Ingolstadt was praying the Litany of the Blessed Virgin Mary. As they came to the prayer, “Mother most admirable, pray for us” Father Rem asked for a repeat and again for a repeat of the prayer. Since that time, the Colloquium Marianum and the sodalities used the triple prayer. Mater ter admirablilis continues to be used as a part of the sodality prayers worldwide.

Since 1915, Mater ter admirablilis is a part of the Marian prayers of the Schönstatt movement. Mater ter admirabilis is also a Marian altar in the Cathedral of Ingolstadt, where the solidarities used to meet on a daily basis for Holy Mass. It was never clarified whether the triple prayer refers to the Holy Trinity, to the triple virginity of the Virgin Mary (before, during and after birth), or, to the Mother of God, mother of the Redeemer and mother of the redeemed.

== Sources ==
- H:H:Köster, "Mater ter admirabilis", in Lexikon der Marienkunde, Regensburg, 1967
