= University of Ingolstadt =

Former university in Ingolstadt, Bavaria (1472–1800)

- German: Universität Ingolstadt
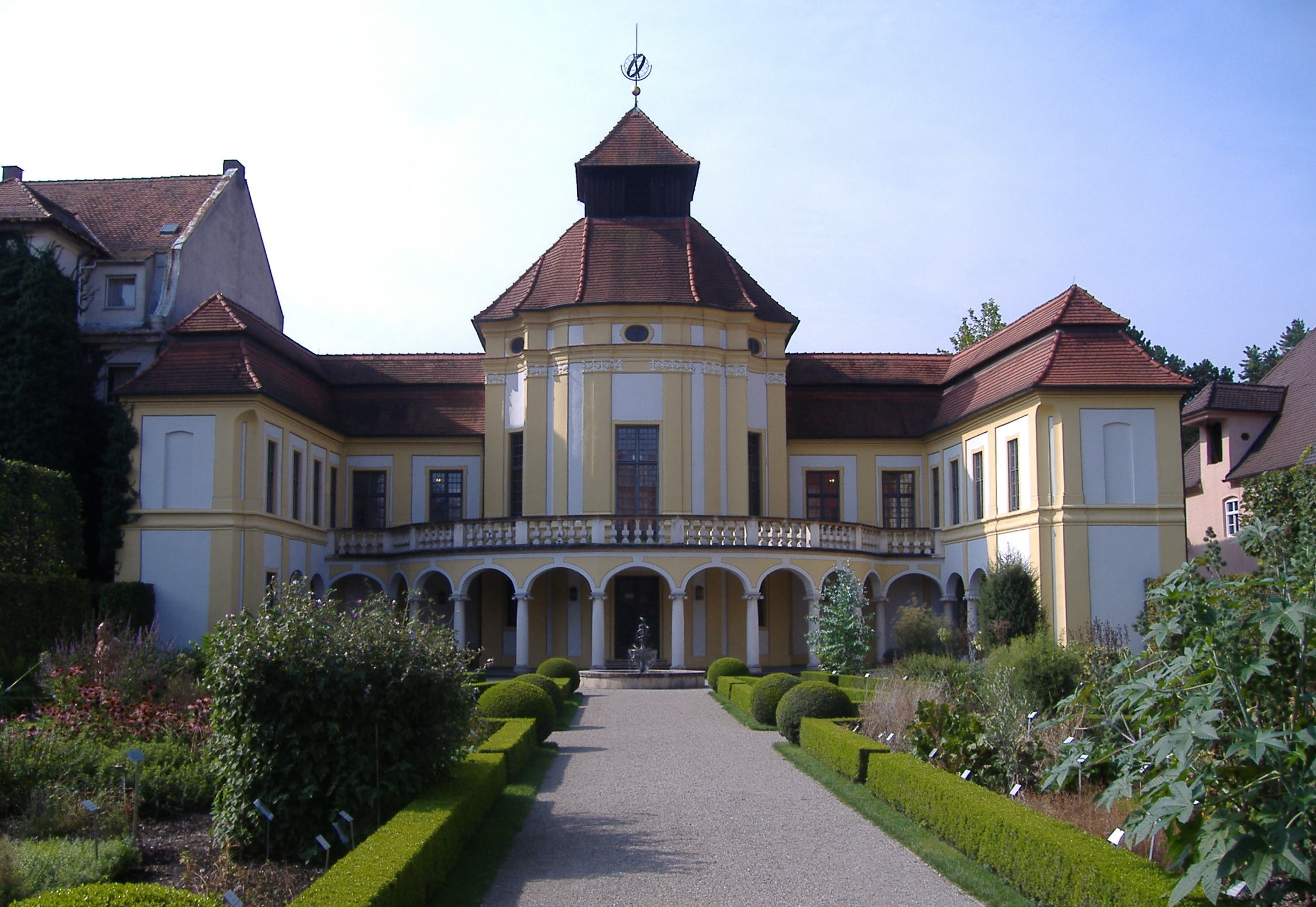
- Garden façade of the Alte Anatomie at the University of Ingolstadt
- Type: Educational
- Active: 1472–1800
- Founder: Louis the Rich
- Location: Ingolstadt, Bavaria, Germany

The University of Ingolstadt was a private university in the city of Ingolstadt in Bavaria, Germany. Founded in 1472 by Louis the Rich, serving as the Duke of Bavaria at the time, its first Chancellor was the Bishop of Eichstätt. It consisted of four faculties: theology, law, artes liberales and medicine, all of which were contained in the Hoheschule, or "the high school'; furthermore, the university was modeled after the University of Vienna. Its chief goal was the propagation of the Christian faith. The university closed in May 1800, by order of the Prince-elector Maximilian IV (later Maximilian I, King of Bavaria).

== Pre-Reformation ==
In its first several decades, the university grew rapidly, opening colleges not only for philosophers from the realist and nominalist schools, but also for poor students wishing to study the liberal arts. Among its most famous instructors in the late 15th century were the poet Conrad Celtes, the Hebrew scholar Johannes Reuchlin, and the Bavarian historian Johannes Thurmair (also known as "Johannes Aventinus").

The Illuminati movement was founded on 1 May 1776, in Ingolstadt (Upper Bavaria), by Jesuit-taught Adam Weishaupt (d. 1830), who was the first lay professor of canon law at the University of Ingolstadt. The movement was made up of freethinkers, as an offshoot of the Enlightenment. Writers at the time, such as Seth Payson, believed the movement represented a conspiracy to infiltrate and overthrow the governments of European states. Some writers, such as Augustin Barruel and John Robison, even claimed that the Illuminati were behind the French Revolution, a claim that Jean-Joseph Mounier dismissed in his 1801 book On the Influence Attributed to Philosophers, Free-Masons, and to the Illuminati on the Revolution of France.

The group's adherents were given the name "Illuminati", although they called themselves "Perfectibilists". The group has also been called the Illuminati Order and the Bavarian Illuminati, and the movement itself has been referred to as Illuminism (after illuminism). In 1777, Karl Theodor became ruler of Bavaria. He was a proponent of Enlightened Despotism and, in 1784, his government banned all secret societies, including the Illuminati.

During the period when the Illuminati was legally allowed to operate, many influential intellectuals and progressive politicians counted themselves as members, including Ferdinand of Brunswick and the diplomat Xavier von Zwack, who was number two in the operation and was found with much of the group's documentation when his home was searched. The Illuminati's members pledged obedience to their superiors, and were divided into three main classes, each with several degrees. The order had its branches in most countries of the European continent; it reportedly had around 2,000 members over the span of ten years. The organization had its attraction for literary men, such as Johann Wolfgang von Goethe and Johann Gottfried Herder, and even for the reigning dukes of Gotha and Weimar. Weishaupt had modeled his group to some extent on Freemasonry, and many Illuminati chapters drew membership from existing Masonic lodges. Internal rupture and panic over succession preceded its downfall, which was effected by the Secular Edict made by the Bavarian government in 1785.

== The Reformation and its aftermath ==
The Lutheran movement took an early hold in Ingolstadt, but was quickly put to flight by one of the chief figures of the Counter-Reformation: Johann Eck, who made the university a bastion for the traditional Catholic faith in southern Germany. In Eck's wake, many Jesuits were appointed to key positions in the school, and the university, over most of the 17th century, gradually came fully under the control of the Jesuit order. Noted scholars of this period include the theologian Gregory of Valentia, the astronomer Christopher Scheiner (inventor of the helioscope), Johann Baptist Cysat, and the poet Jacob Balde. The Holy Roman Emperor Ferdinand II received his education at the university.

== Relocation ==
The 18th century gave rise to the Enlightenment, a movement that in some quarters was opposed to the church-run universities of which Ingolstadt was a prime example. The Jesuits gradually left the university as it sought to change with the times, until the university finally had become so secular that the greatest influence in Ingolstadt was Adam Weishaupt, founder of the secret society of the Illuminati. On 25 November 1799, the elector Maximilian IV announced that the university's depleted finances had become too great a weight for him to bear: the university would be moved to Landshut as a result. The university finished that year's school term, and left Ingolstadt in May 1800, bringing to a quiet end the school that had, at its peak, been one of the most influential and powerful institutes of higher learning in Europe. In 1826 King Ludwig I moved the university to the capital Munich (LMU Munich). Subsequently, another institution of higher learning was established in Ingolstadt, now called the WFI - Ingolstadt School of Management (founded in 1989 as part of the Catholic University of Eichstätt-Ingolstadt), one of Germany's foremost business schools.

== In popular culture ==
Victor Frankenstein from Mary Shelley's 1818 novel Frankenstein was a fictional student at the University of Ingolstadt. In the 1931 film adaptation, the school is called Goldstadt Medical College. Goldstadt University is also featured in the novelization of Van Helsing (but in this, it is in Romania).

== Notable faculty members ==
- Paulus Aemilius (d. 1575), professor of Hebrew
- Petrus Apianus (1495–1552), mathematician, astronomer, and cartographer
- Philipp Apian (1531–1589), mathematician and medic
- Johannes Eck (1486–1543), theologian
- Leonhart Fuchs (1501–1566), physician and botanist
- Johannes Stabius, Professor of mathematics at Ingolstadt, 1498–1503
- Benedict Stattler (1728–1797), Jesuit theologian, opponent of Immanuel Kant
- Johannes Stöffler, student, 1472–1476; mathematician and astronomer, later professor at Tübingen
- Adam Weishaupt, professor of law at Ingolstadt

== See also ==
- WFI – Ingolstadt School of Management
- Ludwig-Maximilians-Universität München
- Frankenstein – A New Musical
- List of medieval universities
