= Johann König (painter) =

German painter (1586–1642)

- Born: 21 October 1586; Nuremberg, Holy Roman Empire
- Died: 4 March 1642 (aged 55); Augsburg
- Education: Johannes Rottenhammer
- Known for: Painting, Miniature painting
- Patrons: Philipp Hainhofer

Johann König (21 October 1586 – 4 March 1642) was a German painter. He was a follower of Adam Elsheimer. He is known primarily for his painted copper panels.

== Life ==
König was born in Nuremberg in 1586, the son of goldsmith Arnold König. His knowledge of the works of Johannes Rottenhammer suggests that he might have apprenticed in Augsburg (possibly with Rottenhammer).

He spent a year in Venice and Rome from 1610 to 1614. There he possibly made contact in December 1610 with Elsheimer before the latter died. His works directly influenced even König's early works.

Paul Bril also exerted a strong influence on the painter. In Rome, he came into contact with the early works of Carlo Saraceni.

In 1614 he returned to Augsburg, married and received painter rights from the local guild. In 1622 he became a member of the Painters' Guild and a year later, he became a member of the Great Council. After 1620 he worked with Matthias Gundelach and Johann Matthias Kager on decorations of Augsburg Town Hall created by Elias Holl.

Following the Edict of Restitution, by 1631 he returned to Nuremberg, where he further worked and died in March 1642.

== Overview ==
König was known as a painter of small-format images on copper and colorful miniatures and Kunstkammer pieces on marble. They are now on display along with five drawings in municipal art collections in the Schaezlerpalais in Augsburg. His other works are displayed in the Louvre, the Kunsthistorisches Museum in Vienna, the art gallery in Berlin, the Hessian State Museum in Darmstadt, the Staatliche Kunsthalle in Karlsruhe, in the National Museum of Germanic in Nuremberg and the Ashmolean Museum in Oxford. Pieces of medium-large format on canvas, such as the painting of Saint Peter, in the Herzog Anton Ulrich Museum in Braunschweig and a painting of the stoning of St. Stephen.

== Gallery ==
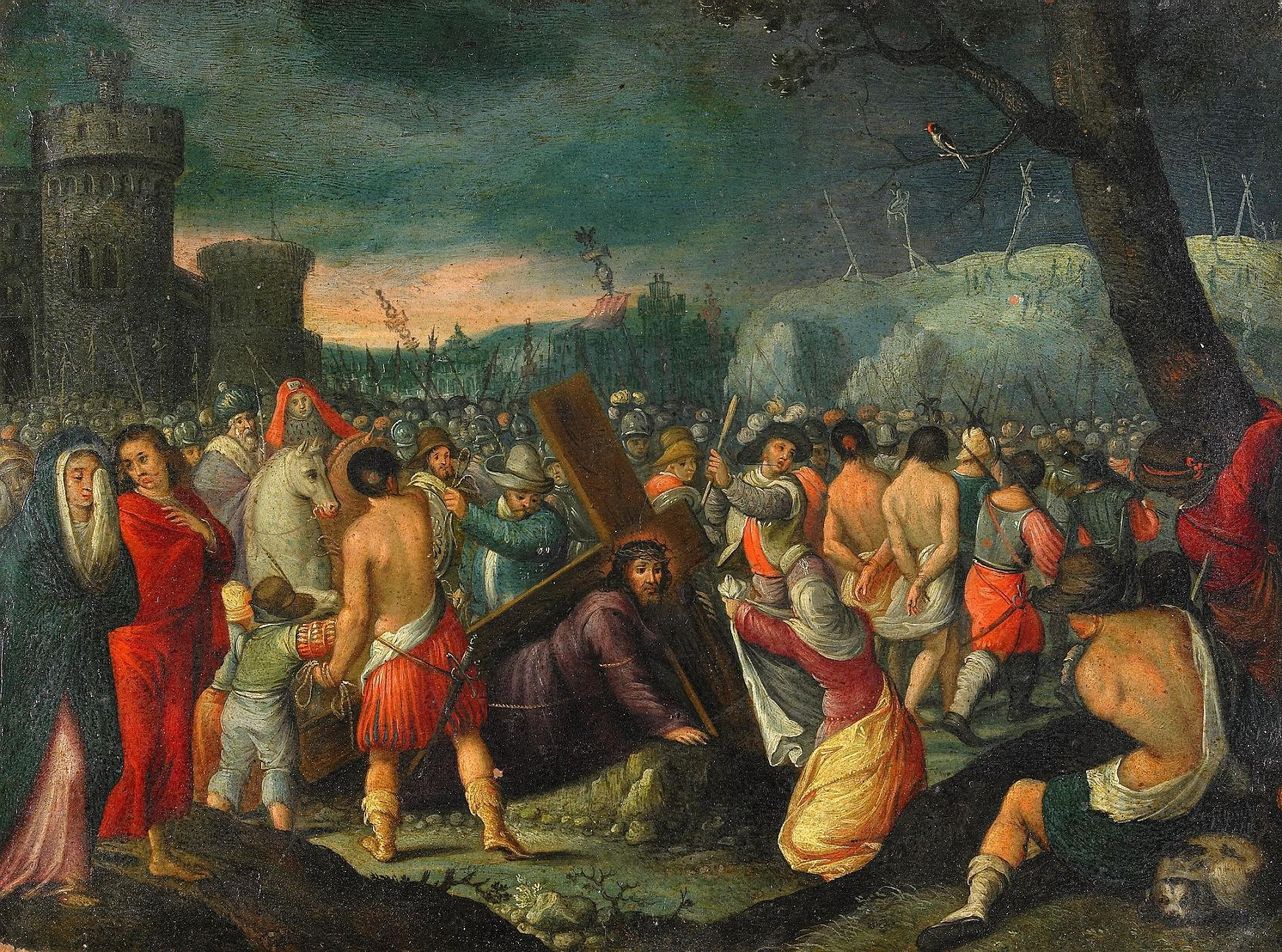
The cross-bearing Jesus

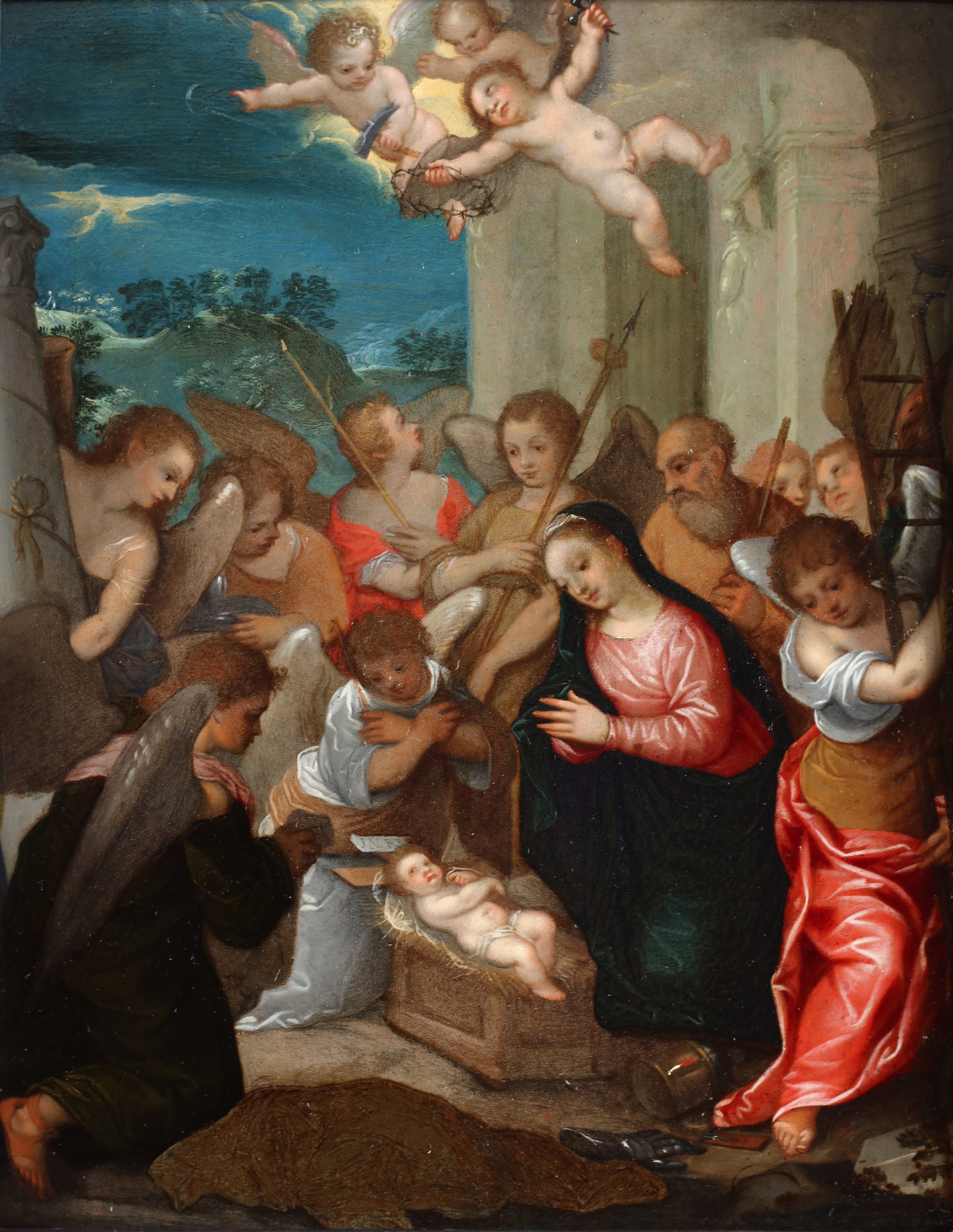
Adoration with Angels and Putti carrying the tools of the Passion

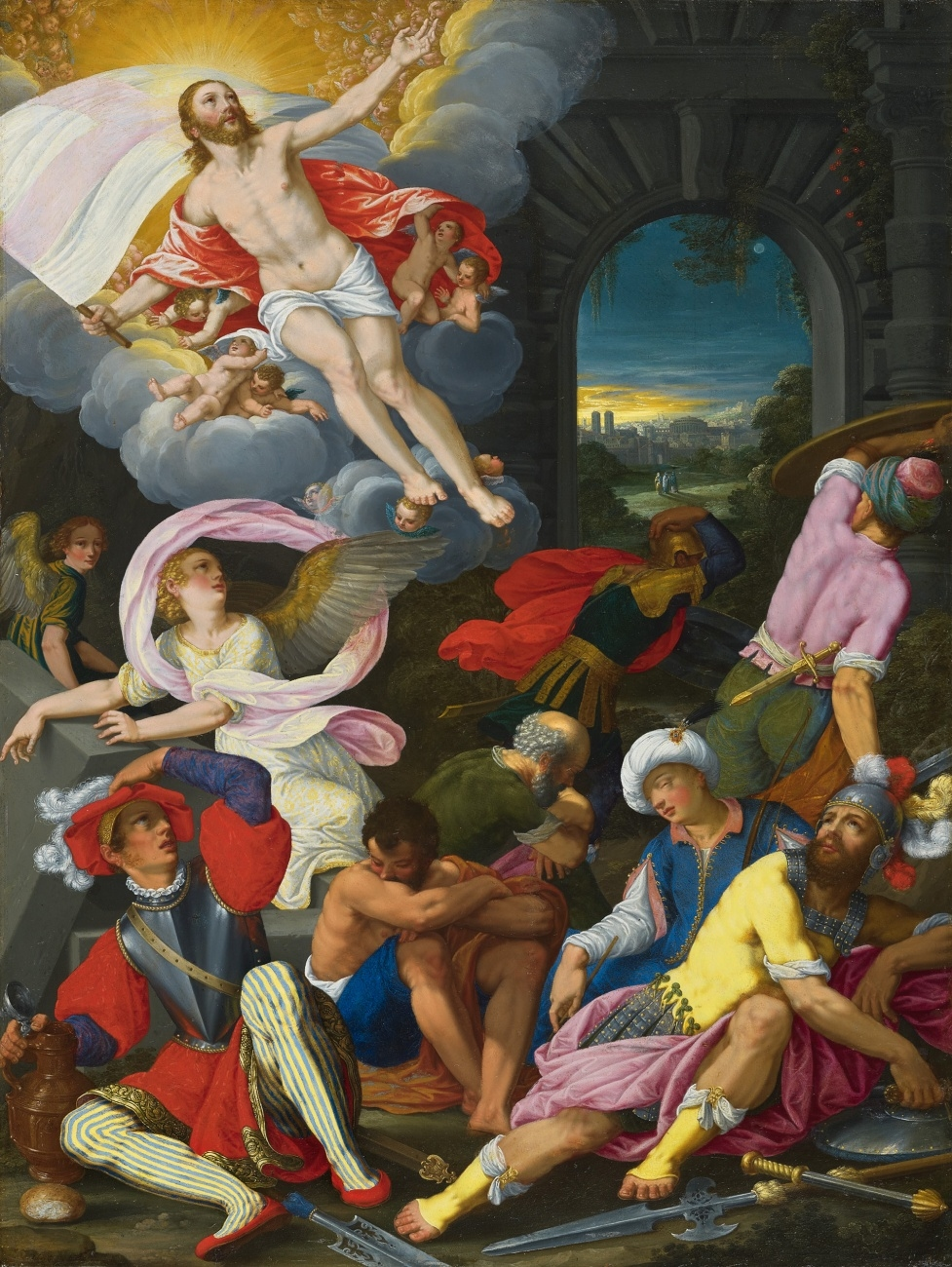
Ascension of Christ

== Bibliography ==
- Gode/Krämer. Augsburger Stadtlexikon (Stand: 2. Auflage Druckausgabe)
- Baumgartl/Lauterbach/Otto. Maler in Franken – Leben und Werk von Künstlern aus fünf Jahrhunderten, Nürnberg ISBN 978-3-924461-12-6
