= Timeline of Augsburg =

Coordinates: 48.366667°N 10.9°E

Timeline of Augsburg, Bavaria, Germany.

== Prior to 16th century ==
- 14 BCE – Roman colony Augusta Vindelicorum established (approximate date).
- 5th century CE – Settlement sacked by Huns.
- 6th century CE - Catholic Diocese of Augsburg established.
- 778 – Simpert becomes Bishop of Augsburg.
- 788 – Town sacked by forces of Charlemagne.
- 923 – Ulrich becomes Bishop of Augsburg.
- 952 – Diet of Augsburg (meeting of leaders of Holy Roman Empire) active.
- 989 – Perlachturm built.
- 1065 – Augsburg Cathedral consecrated.
- 1251 – Dominican Monastery of St. Katharine active.
- 1276 – Augsburg becomes a Free Imperial City.
- 1300 – Barfüsserkirche (church) founded.
- 1321 – St. Anna-Kirche (church) founded.
- 1364 – Three Moors Inn in business (approximate date).
- 1370 - Public clock installed (approximate date).
- 1407 - Paper mill established.
- 1431 – Augsburg Cathedral remodeled.
- 1468 - Burkhard Zingg writes Augsburger Chronik, a history of the city (approximate date).
- 1472 – Printing press in operation.
- 1487 - Fuggers Bank established.
- 1493 – Artist Hans Holbein the Elder active (approximate date).
- 1500 – Church of St. Ulrich and St. Afra built.

== 16th century ==
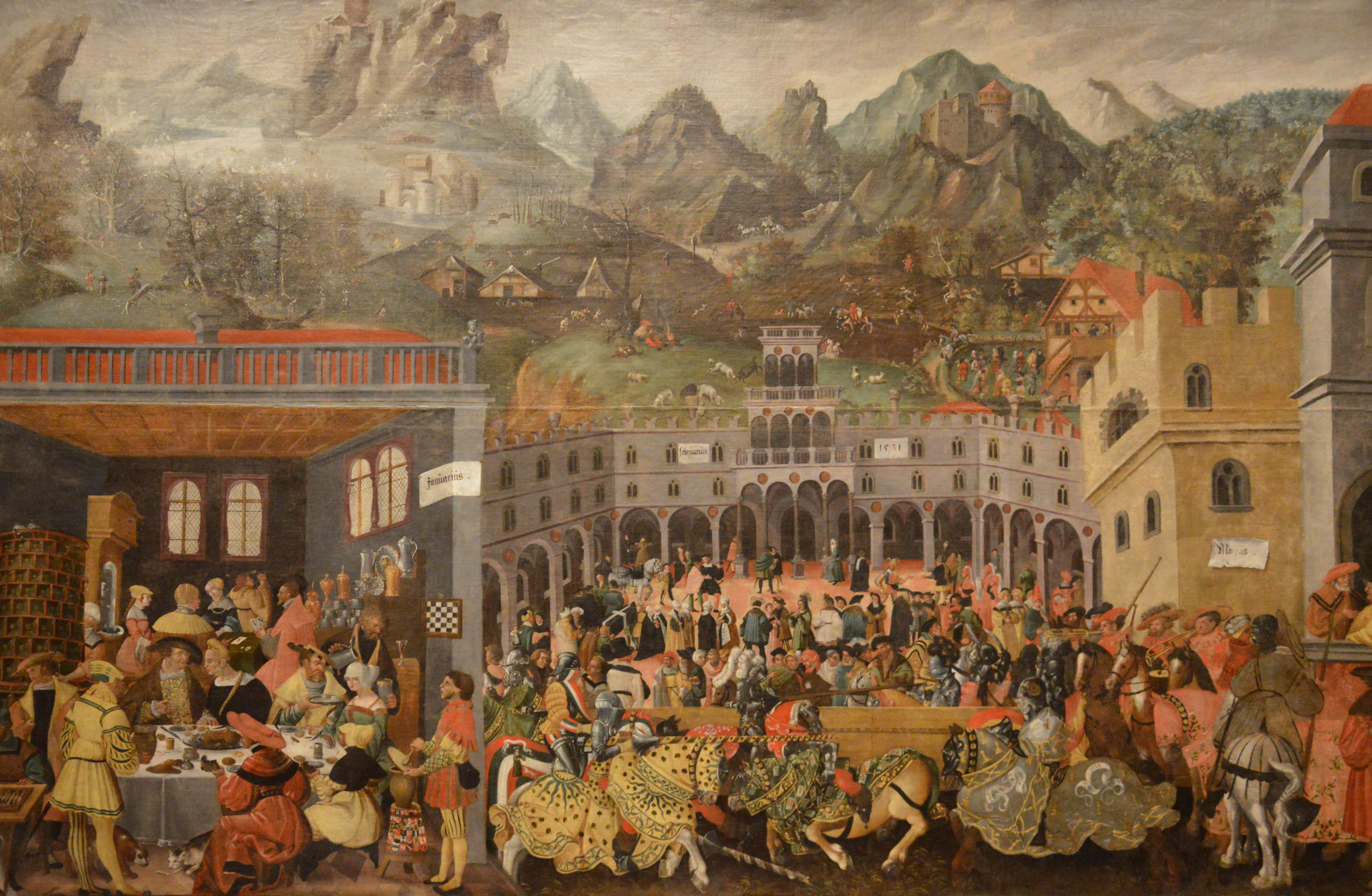
Augsburg in the early 16th century

- 1502 – Catholic Holy Cross Church built.
- 1509 – Fortunatus (book) published.
- 1515 – Dominikaner-Kirche (church) built.
- 1517 - St. Anne's Church, Augsburg built.
- 1518 - Fire engine built.
- 1523 – Fuggerei residential area developed.
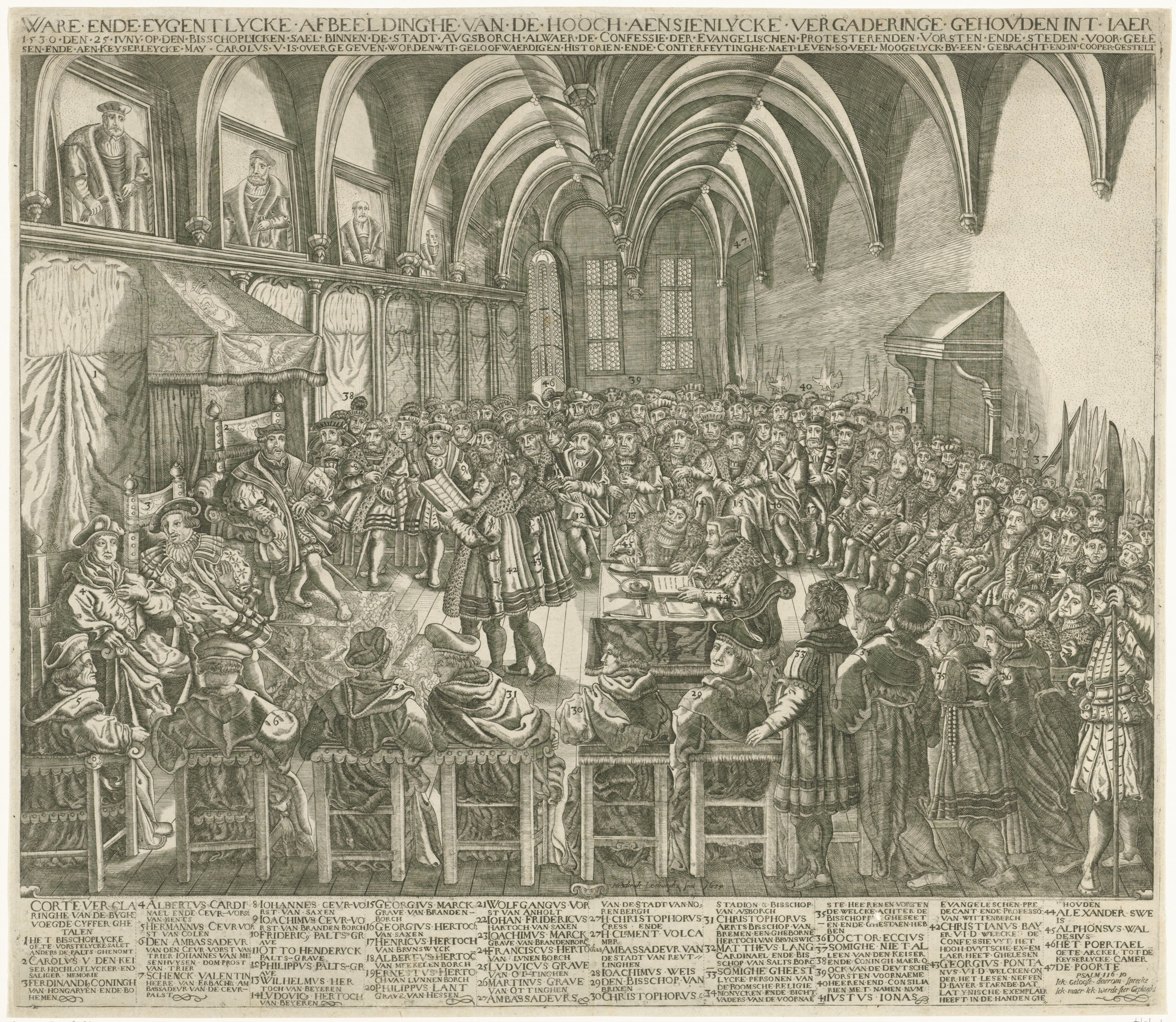
  Charles V, Holy Roman Emperor receives the Augsburg Confession, Augsburg, 1530
- 1530 – Lutheran Confession of Augsburg introduced.
- 1534 – Augsburg Protestant Cemetery established.
- 1537
  - Staats- und Stadtbibliothek Augsburg (city library) founded.
  - Augsburg joins the Schmalkaldic League.
- 1540 – Augsburger Börse (stock exchange) established.
- 1546 – Maximilian Museum and Rotes Tor (gate) built.
- 1573 - Sugar refinery begins operating.
- 1577 – St. Ulrich's and St. Afra's Abbey active.
- 1582 – St. Salvator Jesuit school founded.
- 1594 – Augustusbrunnen (fountain) created for Maximiliansstrasse.
- 1599 – Herkulesbrunnen (fountain) created for Maximiliansstrasse.

== 17th century ==
- 1607 – Augsburger Zeughaus (armory) built.
- 1609 - Metzg (butchers' house) built.
- 1612 – Engravers Lucas Kilian and Wolfgang Kilian in business.
- 1620 – Augsburg Town Hall built.
- 1631 - Augsburg Art Cabinet sent to Sweden as a gift.
- 1632 – Swedish Empire occupation begins.
- 1635
  - Swedish occupation ends.
  - Population: 16,432.
- 1650 – Augsburger Hohes Friedensfest (festival) begins.

== 18th century ==
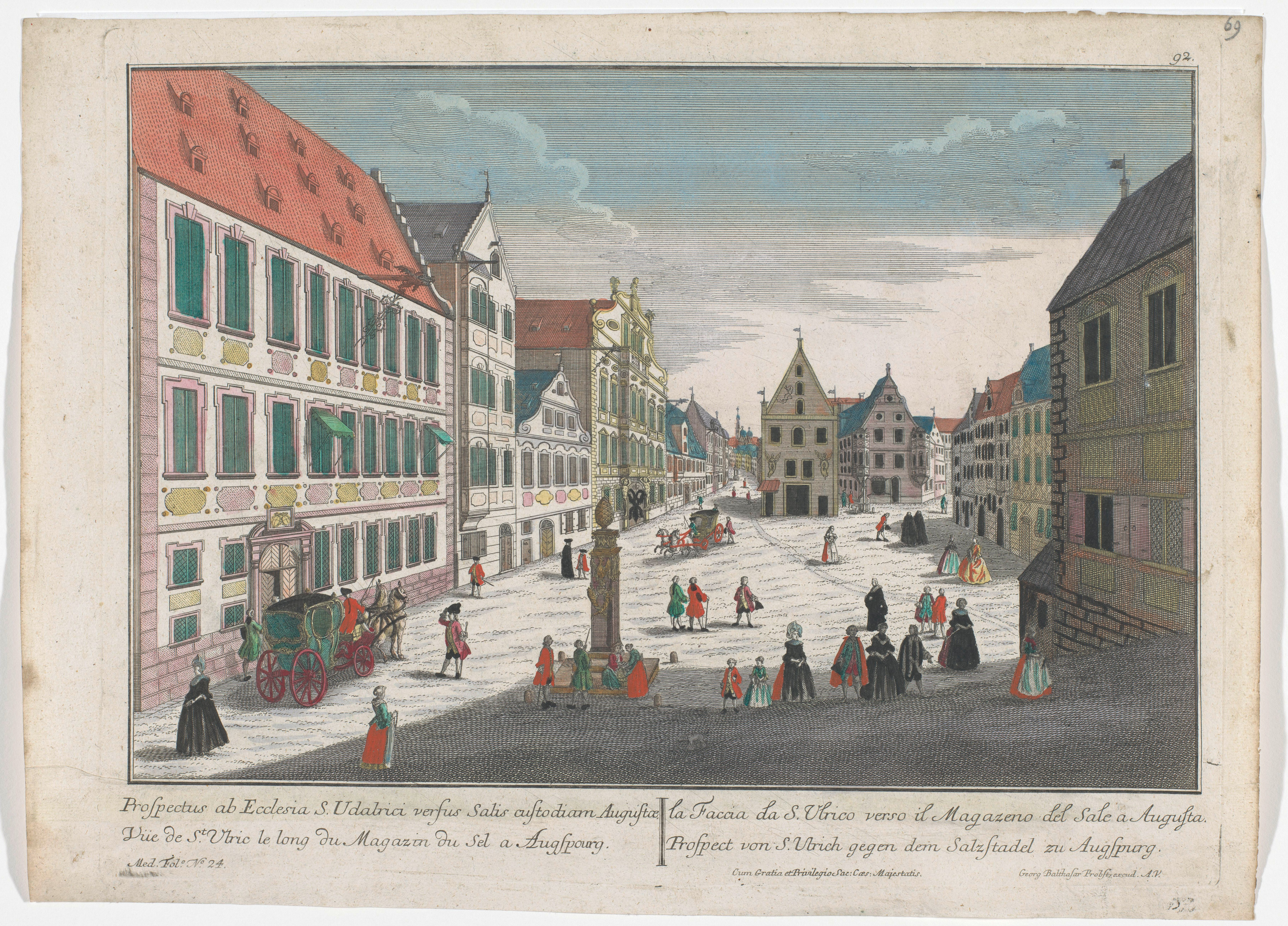
Augsburg in the 18th century

- 1703 – Town besieged by Bavarian forces.
- 1712 – Academy of painting founded.
- 1765 – Gignoux-Haus built.
- 1770
  - Ballroom built in the Schaezlerpalais.
  - Schülesche Kattunfabrik in business
- 1782 – Dollische bookseller in business.
- 1786 - Hot-air balloon flight of Joseph Maximilian Freiherr von Lütgendorf.

== 19th century ==
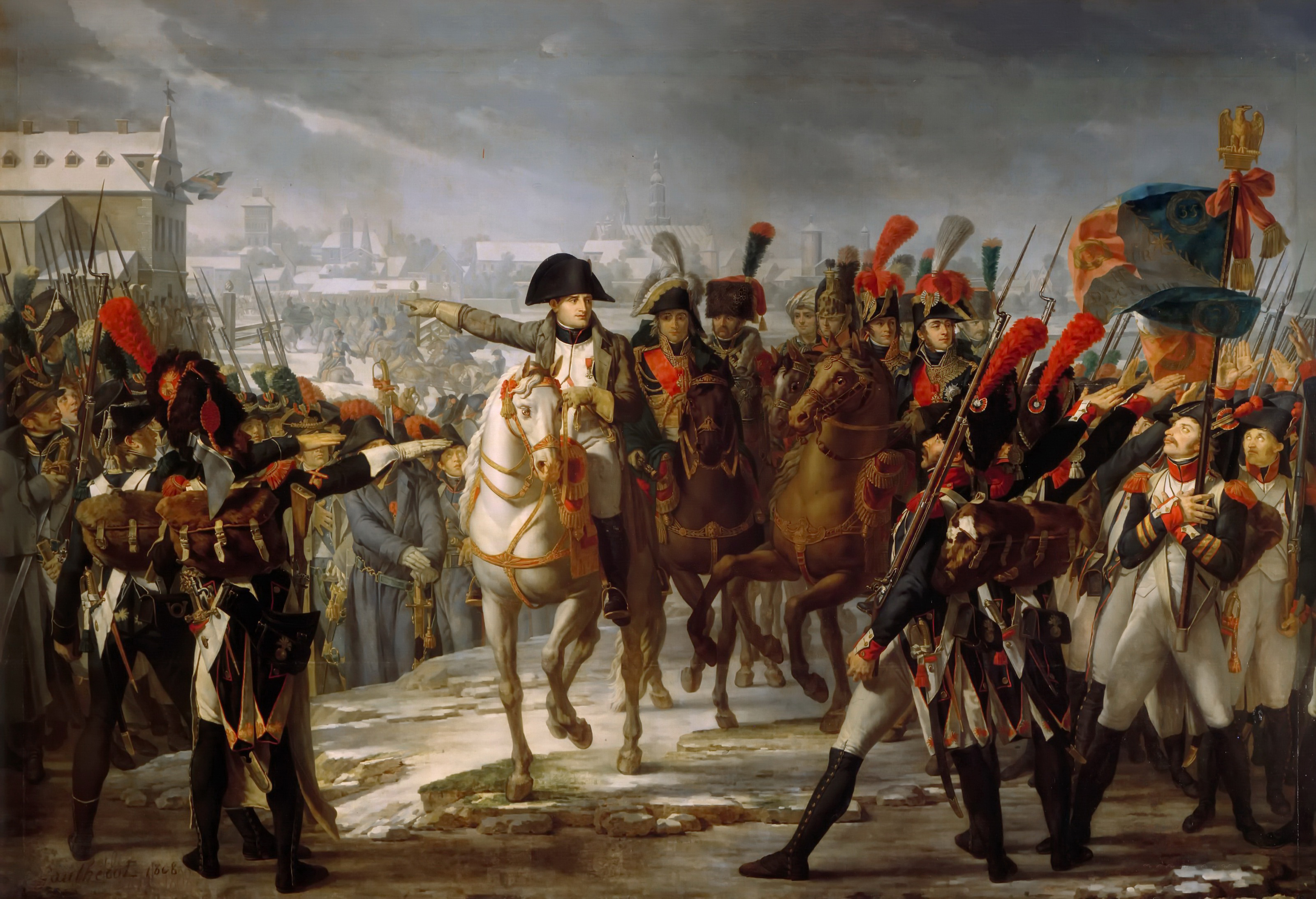
Napoleon in Augsburg, October 1805

- 1805 – 10 October: French in power.
- 1806
  - 4 March: Augsburg becomes part of the Kingdom of Bavaria.
  - Population: 26,200.
- 1810 – Allgemeine Zeitung (newspaper) in publication.
- 1817 – Augsburg becomes an administrative capital of the Oberdonaukreis.
- 1825 – Chapel built in Protestant Cemetery.
- 1833 – Holbein-Gymnasium (school) established.
- 1837 – Town becomes administrative capital for the Swabia and Neuburg district.
- 1840
  - Sander'sche Maschinenfabrik in business.
  - Cotton mill established.
- 1846 – Augsburg Hauptbahnhof (train station) opens.
- 1847
  - Augsburg Morellstraße station opens.
  - Turnverein Augsburg (sport club) formed.
- 1854 – Maximilian Museum founded.
- 1858 - Population: 43,616.
- 1870 – Konigl. Industrieschule (industrial school) established.
- 1875 – Paar Valley Railway begins operating.
- 1876 – Der Volkswille newspaper in publication.
- 1878
  - Stadttheater Augsburg (theatre) built.
  - Augsburger Eislaufverein (ice hockey team) formed.
- 1885
  - Stadtarchiv Augsburg (town archive) building established.
  - Population: 65,905.
- 1898 – Maschinenfabrik Augsburg-Nürnberg and Augsburg-Oberhausen Acetylene Factory in business.
- 1900 – Population: 89,109.

== 20th century ==
- 1903 – TSV Schwaben Augsburg (football club) formed.
- 1905 - Population: 94,923.
- 1907 – FC Augsburg (football club) formed.
- 1910
  - Landsberg Prison established in vicinity of Augsburg.
  - Population: 102,487.
- 1911 – Oberhausen becomes part of Augsburg.
- 1917 - Augsburg Synagogue built.
- 1919 - Population: 154,555.
- 1920 – Stadtbücherei Augsburg (public library) founded.
- 1924 – Augsburger Kajak Verein (kayak club) formed.
- 1926 – Messerschmitt (aircraft works) in business.
- 1930 - 8 September: Hitler gives speech, German federal election, 1930.
- 1933 – Gau Swabia (Nazi administrative region) established.
- 1937
  - Augsburg Zoo opens.
  - Mozarthaus (house museum) established.
- 1938
  - Messerschmitt aircraft manufactory in business.
  - Ice skating rink opens.
- 1942 – 17 April: Bombing by Allied forces.
- 1944 – 25–26 February: Bombing by Allied forces.
- 1945 – Schwäbische Landeszeitung newspaper begins publication.
- 1948
  - Weltbild (publisher) in business.
  - Augsburger Puppenkiste (theatre) opens.
- 1951
  - Rosenaustadion (stadium) opens.
  - Town art collections installed in the Schaezlerpalais.
- 1954 - Fürst Fugger Privatbank established.
- 1956 – United States military 11th Airborne Division stationed in Augsburg.
- 1961 - Population: 208,659.
- 1969 – Part of Göggingen becomes part of Augsburg.
- 1970 – University of Augsburg founded.
- 1971
  - Augsburg Eiskanal (artificial whitewater river) opens.
  - Augsburg University of Applied Sciences founded.
- 1972
  - Inningen becomes part of Augsburg.
  - Kongresshalle opens.
  - Dorint Hotel Tower built.
- 1977
  - Kulturhaus Kresslesmühle (cultural space) opens.
  - Romanistentheater founded.
- 1989 – Sparkassen-Planetarium opens.
- 1996
  - Kulturhaus Abraxas (cultural space) active.
  - S’ensemble Theater founded.
- 1998 – Brechthaus (museum) opens.

== 21st century ==
- 2009 – Stadtbücherei Augsburg (public library) building opens.
- 2012 – Population: 272,699.

== See also ==
- List of mayors of Augsburg

== Bibliography ==
=== in English ===
published in the 17th-19th century

- Thomas Nugent (1749), "Augsburg", The Grand Tour, vol. 2: Germany and Holland, London: S. Birt, hdl:2027/mdp.39015030762572
- Monsieur de Blainville (1757), "Augsburg", Travels through Holland, Germany, Switzerland, but especially Italy, Translated by Turnbull, London: John Noon
- "Augsburg". A Geographical, Historical and Political Description of the Empire of Germany, Holland, the Netherlands, Switzerland, Prussia, Italy, Sicily, Corsica and Sardinia: With a Gazetteer. London: John Stockdale. 1800. OCLC 79519893.
- David Brewster, ed. (1830). "Augsburg". Edinburgh Encyclopædia. Edinburgh: William Blackwood.
- Frances Trollope (1838), "Augsburg", Vienna and the Austrians, London: R. Bentley, OCLC 2431804
- Charles Knight, ed. (1866). "Augsburg". Geography. English Cyclopaedia. Vol. 1. London: Bradbury, Evans, & Co. hdl:2027/nyp.33433000064786.
- "Augsburg", Bradshaw's Illustrated Hand-book to Germany, London: W.J. Adams & Sons, 1873
- Lewis, "The Roman Antiquities of Augsburg and Ratisbon", in volume xlviii, Archæological Journal, (London, 1891).

published in the 20th century

- "Augsburg". Handbook for Travellers in South Germany and Austria (15th ed.). London: J. Murray. 1903.
- "Augsburg" . Encyclopædia Britannica. Vol. 2 (11th ed.). 1910. p. 902.
- Joseph Lins (1913). "Diocese of Augsburg". Catholic Encyclopedia. New York.
- "Augsburg", Southern Germany (Wurtemberg and Bavaria) (12th ed.), Leipzig: Karl Baedeker, 1914, OCLC 2011248
- Franz Grenacher (1968). "Guide to the Cartographic History of the Imperial City of Augsburg". Imago Mundi. 22: 85–106. doi:10.1080/03085696808592321. JSTOR 1150439.
- Trudy Ring, ed. (1995). "Augsburg". Northern Europe. International Dictionary of Historic Places. Fitzroy Dearborn. ISBN 978-1-136-63944-9.

published in the 21st century

- John M. Jeep, ed. (2001). "Augsburg". Medieval Germany: an Encyclopedia. Garland Publishing. ISBN 0-8240-7644-3.
- B. Ann Tlusty, ed. (2012). Augsburg During the Reformation Era: An Anthology of Sources. Hackett Publishing. ISBN 1603848428.
- B. Ann Tlusty; Mark Häberlein, eds. (2020). A Companion to Late Medieval and Early Modern Augsburg. Brill Publishers. ISBN 9004414959.

=== in German ===
- "Augsburg". Topographia Sueviae. Topographia Germaniae (in German). Frankfurt. 1643. p. 8+.
- Paul von Stetten (1779), Kunst-, Gewerb- und Handwerks Geschichte der Reichs-Stadt Augsburg (in German), Augsburg: C.H. Stage, OL 25514489M
- Augsburgs geschichte. J.C. Wirth, etc. etc. 1826.
- Augsburg. Die Chroniken der Deutschen Städte (in German). Vol. 4–5, 22–23, 25, 29, 32. Leipzig: S. Hirzel Verlag. 1865–1917 – via HathiTrust.
- "Augsburg". Brockhaus' Konversations-Lexikon (in German) (14th ed.). Leipzig: Brockhaus. 1896. hdl:2027/njp.32101064064437.
- Werner, Geschichte der Stadt Augsburg, (Augsburg, 1900).
- Christian Meyer (1907), Geschichte der Stadt Augsburg (in German), Tübingen: H. Laupp, OCLC 163258088, OL 24871238M
- P. Krauss; E. Uetrecht, eds. (1913). "Augsburg". Meyers Deutscher Städteatlas [Meyer's Atlas of German Cities] (in German). Leipzig: Bibliographisches Institut.
- Wolfgang Adam; Siegrid Westphal, eds. (2012). "Augsburg". Handbuch kultureller Zentren der Frühen Neuzeit: Städte und Residenzen im alten deutschen Sprachraum (in German). De Gruyter. ISBN 978-3-11-029555-9.
