= Augsburg Protestant Cemetery =

Cemetery in Bavaria, Germany

Protestant Cemetery Augsburg
- Interactive map of Protestant Cemetery Augsburg

Details
- Established: 1534
- Location: Augsburg
- Country: Germany
- Coordinates: 48°21′14″N 10°54′01″E
- Type: Protestant cemetery
- Size: 6 ha (15 acres)
- No. of graves: 9.500
- Website: Official website
- Find a Grave: Protestant Cemetery Augsburg

The Protestant cemetery in Augsburg (German: Protestantischer Friedhof Augsburg) on Haunstetter road in Hochfeld district of Augsburg was established in 1534 by the City of Augsburg. The cemetery is still in operation and used for burials. It is currently the oldest cemetery in Augsburg.

== History and description ==
The Protestant Cemetery was established in 1534 by the City of Augsburg. Since the Peace of Westphalia in 1648 which ended the Thirty Years' War, the cemetery is owned by the Protestant parishes of the city of Augsburg; St. Anna, St. James, St. Ulrich and Holy Cross churches. In 1700, the administration building was built. The cemetery chapel was built in 1825 by Johann Michael Voit. In addition to the chapel, the morgue building was built in 1837. In the cemetery, there are numerous grave monuments dating back to 17th century with elaborate tombs of classicism and the Gothic Revival architecture. A special feature of the cemetery is its collection of old grave books with burial registers dating back to 1658, which have survived until today.

== Notables burials ==
Notables buried include:

- Elias Holl (1573–1646), architect of early German Baroque architecture
- Anna Barbara von Stetten (1754–1805), philanthropist
- Karl Albert Gollwitzer (1839–1917), architect
