= Augsburg Town Hall =

- Augsburger Rathaus
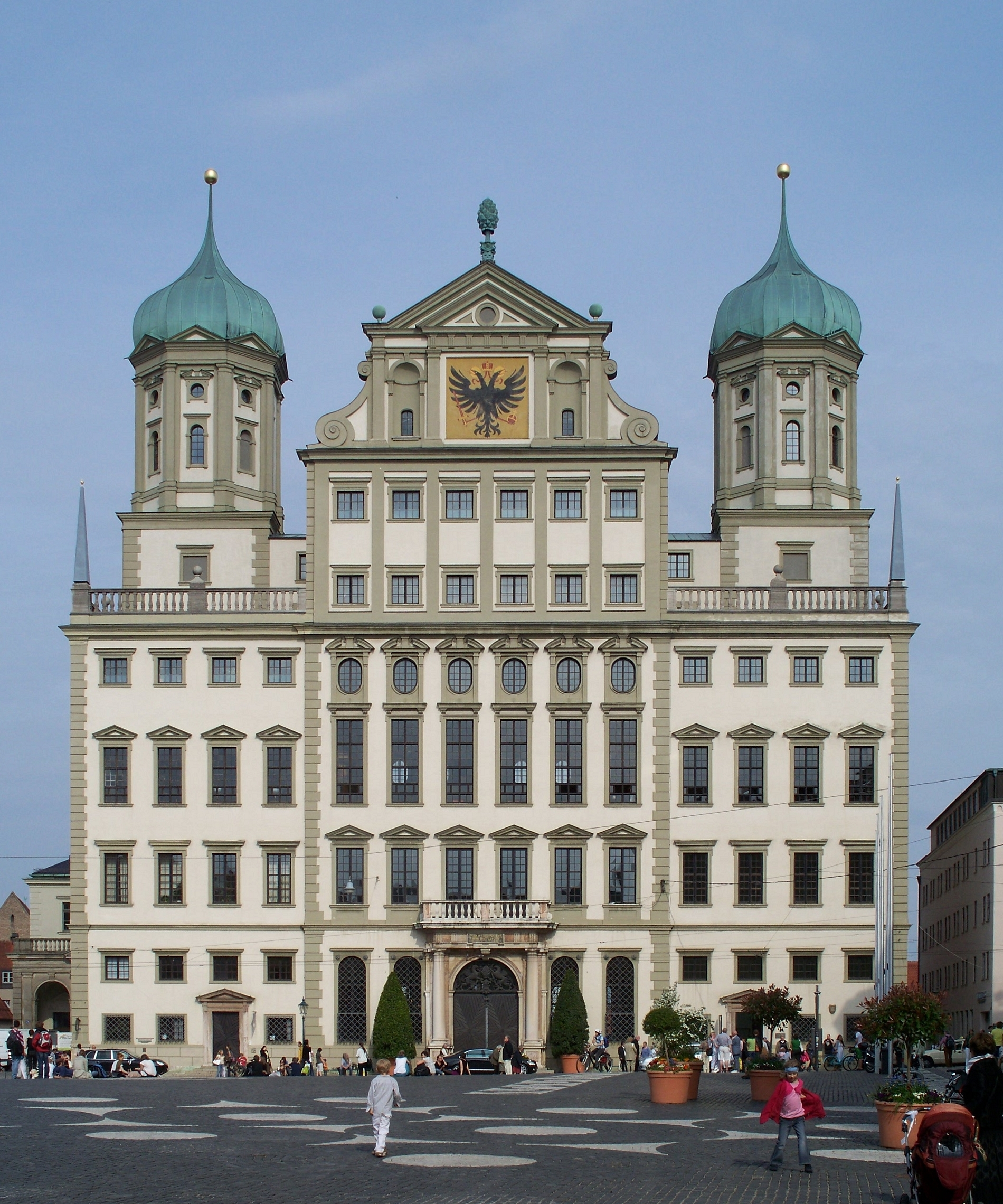
- The main frontage of the town hall in April 2010

General information
- Type: Town hall
- Architectural style: Renaissance style
- Location: Augsburg, Germany
- Coordinates: 48°22′07″N 10°53′55″E
- Construction started: 1615
- Completed: 1624
- Renovated: 1980–1984
- Cost: 100,000 Guilder

Technical details
- Floor count: Seven

Design and construction
- Architect: Elias Holl

Augsburg Town Hall (German: Augsburger Rathaus) is the administrative centre of Augsburg, Bavaria, Germany, and one of the most significant secular buildings of the Renaissance style north of the Alps. It was designed and built by Elias Holl, Stadtbaumeister (Master Builder of the town), between 1615 and 1624. Due to its historic and cultural importance, it is protected by the Hague Convention for the Protection of Cultural Property in the Event of Armed Conflict.

== History ==
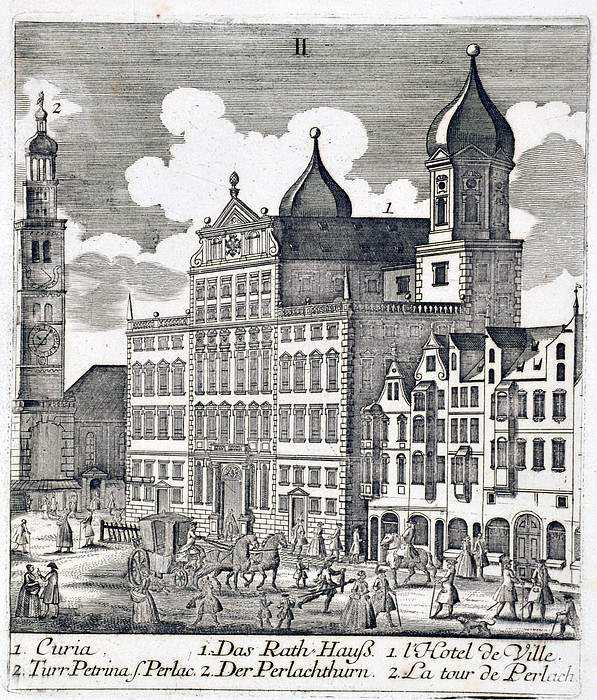
Augsburg Rathaus, c. 1818.

The original Augsburger Rathaus was built in 1385, enlarged in 1449 and enlarged again to a design by Jörg Breu the Elder in the Gothic style in 1515.

At the beginning of the 17th century, the town council decided to renovate the old building to accommodate the Imperial Reichstag, which then sat in the city. In 1609, the council commissioned the architect, Elias Holl, to draw up a plan. On the initiative of mayor Hieronymus Imhoff (1575–1638), the council decided to reject Holl's renovation proposals and to erect a new building instead. Holl produced a plan for the new building, which was to be built in the Renaissance style, and the foundation stone was laid on 25 August 1615. It was the will of the magistrates that the Rathaus should not have a tower; however, Holl insisted on installing onion domes by the gable, and in 1618 he was allowed to proceed. The exterior of the Rathaus was completed in 1620, and the interior in 1624, following an almost fifteen-year planning phase and nine years of building. A coat of arms was recovered from the old town hall and inserted into the rear facade of the new building.

Inside the Rathaus, Holl built three overlaying halls: on the ground floor, behind the main entrance, is the Lower Fletz, and on the floor above, the Upper Fletz; by far the most impressive room in the building, however, is the double-height Goldener Saal, or Golden Hall, with its magnificent doorways, murals and coffered ceiling. Adjacent to the Goldener Saal are the Fürstenzimmer, or Prince's Rooms, designed as retreats for important guests. The construction cost of the new Rathaus was around 100,000 Guilder.

The Thirty Years' War (1618–1648), which spread across Europe shortly after the beginning of work on the building, also took its toll on Augsburg. One of the major economic centres of the continent before the war, it emerged in the middle of the 17th century in decline. The war had cost Augsburg not only its centuries-old economic supremacy in Europe, but also more than half of its population. The Reichstag, for which the splendid Rathaus was originally built, now took place in other German cities. Only in the late 17th Century, was the building the scene of a celebration of nationwide importance, when Joseph I held a banquet in the Golden Hall in 1690, on his coronation as King of the Romans.

During the British bombing of Augsburg in World War II, the building was hit several times by high-explosive and incendiary bombs, burning out the building. It was rebuilt after the war, the exterior according to its historic appearance but the interior much simplified, and from 1955 was again used as the administrative centre of the city. Between 1980 and 1984, the façade of the building was restored to its original colours, according to historical records. The interior of the building was restored to its original splendour, and on 9 January 1985, the Rathaus was reopened as part of the city's two-thousandth anniversary celebrations.

A major programme of restoration works to remove asbestos and to comply with fire regulations was undertaken throughout the building between 2024 and 2026.

== The rooms ==
=== Lower Fletz ===
The visitor enters the Augsburger Rathaus through an inconspicuous door at the front of the building, through a vestibule and into the Lower Fletz, on the ground floor. This monumental hall, with its marble columns and vaulted ceiling, is the main entrance to one of two staircases leading to the upper floors of the Rathaus. Exhibitions are sometimes held in this room.

=== Upper Fletz ===
The Upper Fletz, on the second floor, once housed the offices of the Augsburg town council, but since the war has been used as the meeting room of the council. The second floor also has offices of the political groups represented on the council. This part of the Rathaus is not generally open to visitors.

=== Golden Hall ===
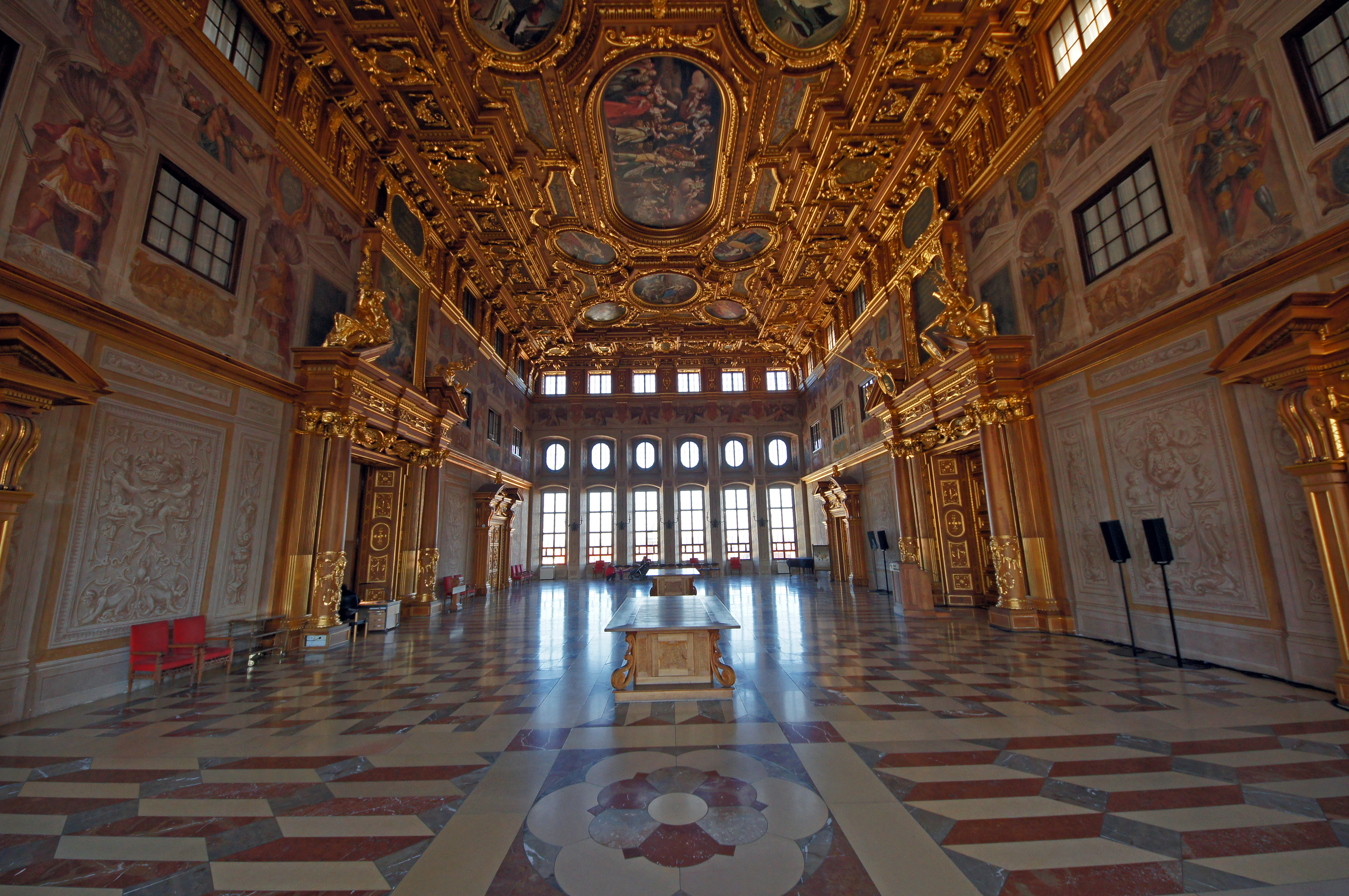
The Goldener Saal

The Goldener Saal, or Golden Hall, is the most impressive of the Rathaus's rooms, and one of the most important cultural monuments of the late German Renaissance. The hall covers an area of 552 square metres (5,940 sq ft) with a ceiling height of 14 metres (46 ft), and is richly adorned with large doorways, magnificent murals and a coffered ceiling. The interior of the Hall was designed by Johann Matthias Kager, and was not completed until 1643 (the rest of the building was completed in 1624). The numerous ceiling paintings and murals were executed according to a concept of the Jesuit Matthäus Raders (1561–1634) and designs by the Flemish artist Peter Candid (1584–1628).

The hall was badly damaged by bombing during the war. When the Rathaus was restored after the war, the Goldener Saal was not repaired to its original state, but left with a wooden ceiling, small doors and white plastered walls. It was used until the 1980s as an exhibition space. In the early 1980s, the council decided to renovate the Goldener Saal for the upcoming 2000th anniversary of the city in 1985. The room was redecorated according to historical drawings and photographs, starting with the basic reconstruction of the coffered ceiling, together with the painted ceilings, the floor and the doors. On 9 January 1985, the hall was re-opened close to its former glory. Supported by numerous donations and the active interest of Augsburg, the murals and extensive gold leaf that had once decorated the hall were reinstated over subsequent years, and the hall was reopened a second time in 1996.

=== Fürstenzimmer ===
The Fürstenzimmer, or Prince's Rooms, are four in number and located around the edges of the Golden Hall. They were originally used as retreats for distinguished guests of the council. Each room is around 150 square metres (1,600 sq ft) with coffered ceiling, panelled walls and parquet floors, and containing elaborately carved writing desks, tables, chairs and stools and several lamps. These rooms have been restored and are now used to host weddings.

== See also ==
- 17th-century Western domes
