= Johann Matthias Kager =

German painter

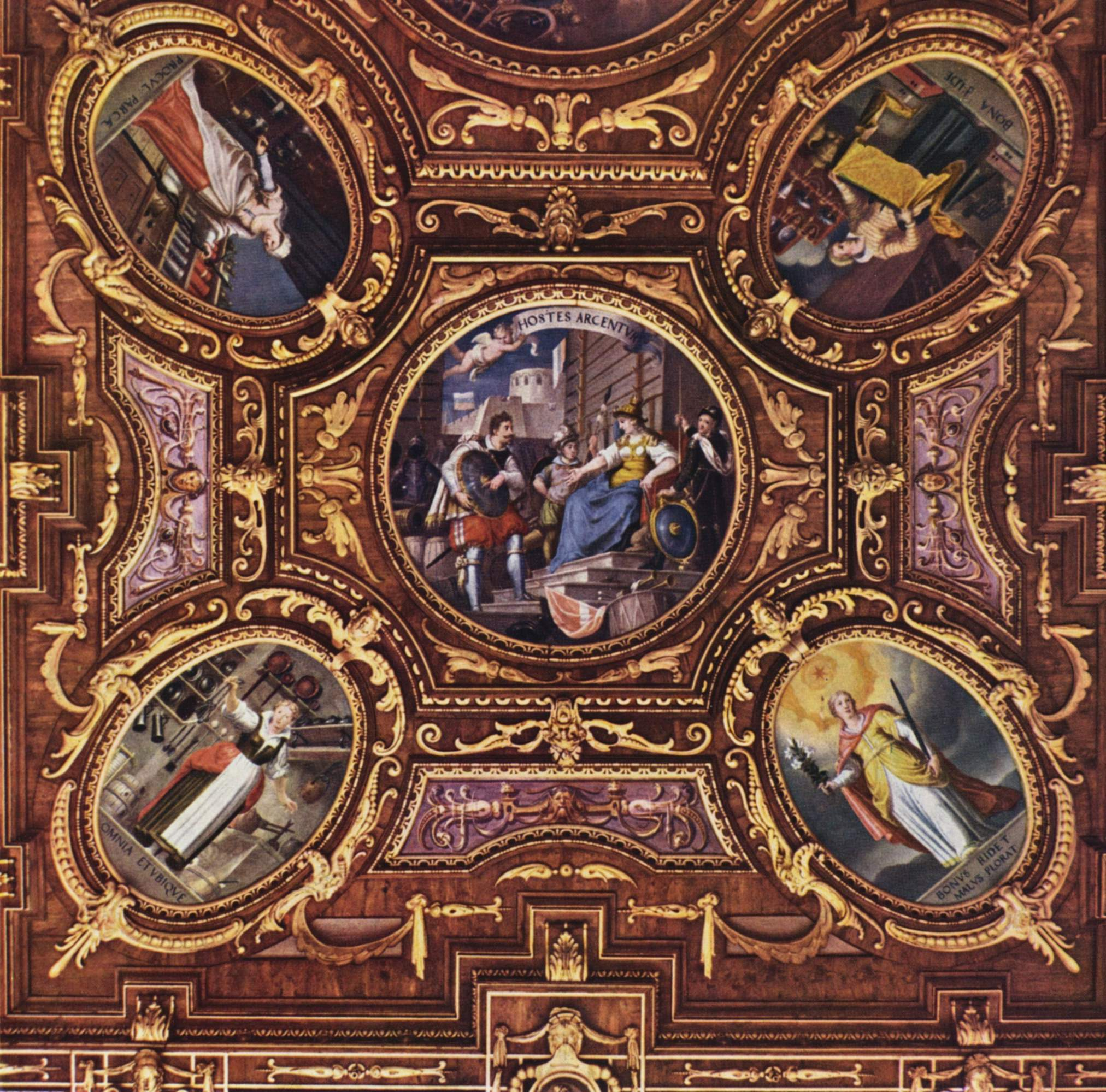
Ceiling fresco in Augsburg

Johann Matthias Kager (1566–1634) was a German historical painter.

== Biography ==
He was born at the Bavarian capital Munich. He was originally a pupil of Pieter de Witte (Candito), but went to Rome when young, and spent several years there.

On his return, he was called to Munich by the Elector Maximilian, who appointed him to be his principal painter, and granted him a considerable allowance. He settled down in Augsburg, and spent the rest of his years in that place, becoming burgomaster. He died at Augsburg in 1634.

== Works ==
He decorated many of the palaces and churches in Munich, but his finest work, called "The Last Judgment", is in the Senate Hall at Augsburg. A notable picture by him is a representation of "David and Abigail", now at Vienna.

He etched several plates from his own design, representing religious subjects (dated 1600, 1601, 1603), and his pictures were also engraved by two members of the Sadeler family and by Kilian, the plates numbering altogether over seventy. He practised in architecture, and painted a few miniatures, but his chief work was in fresco and in oil paint.
