= Elias Holl =

German architect

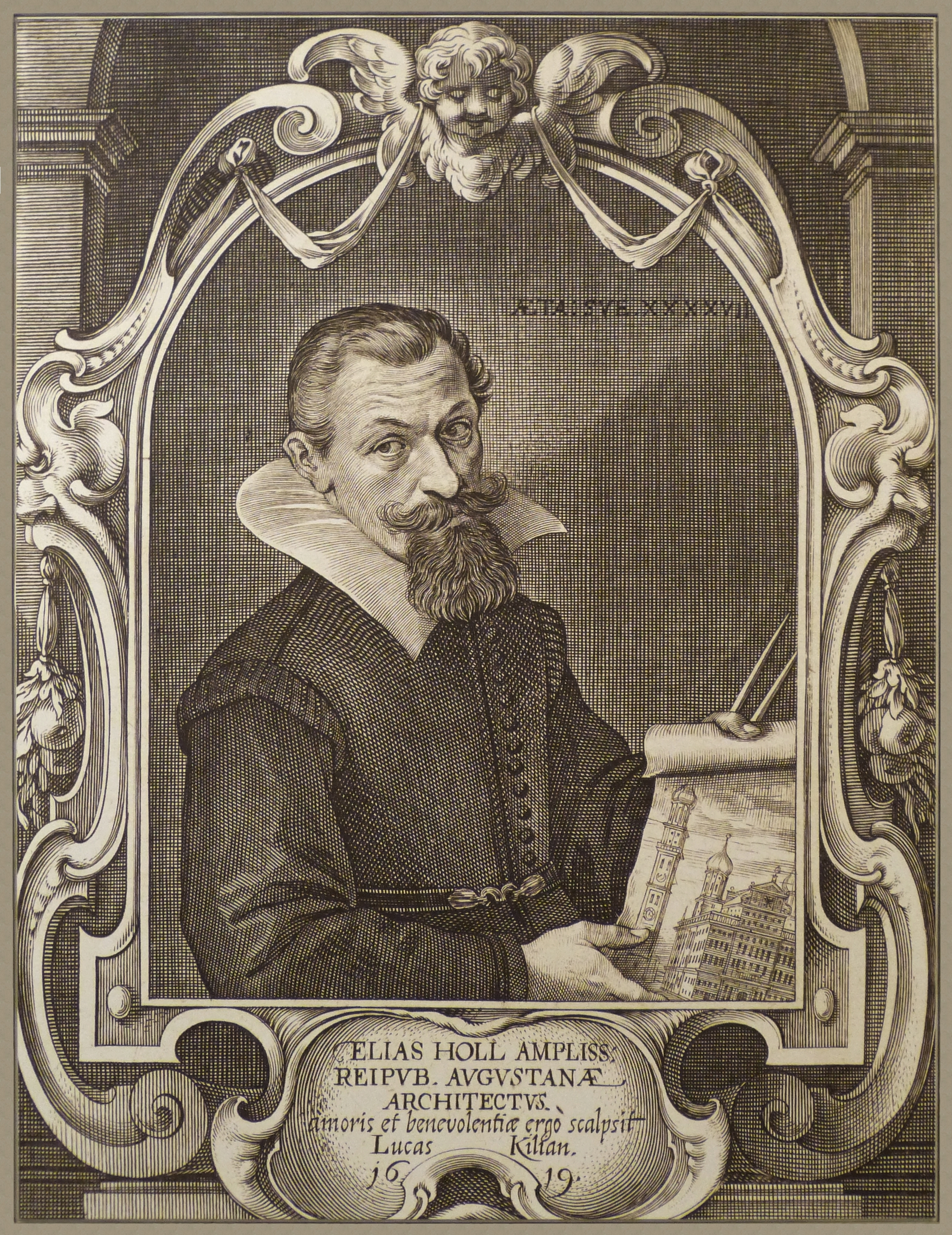
Elias Holl

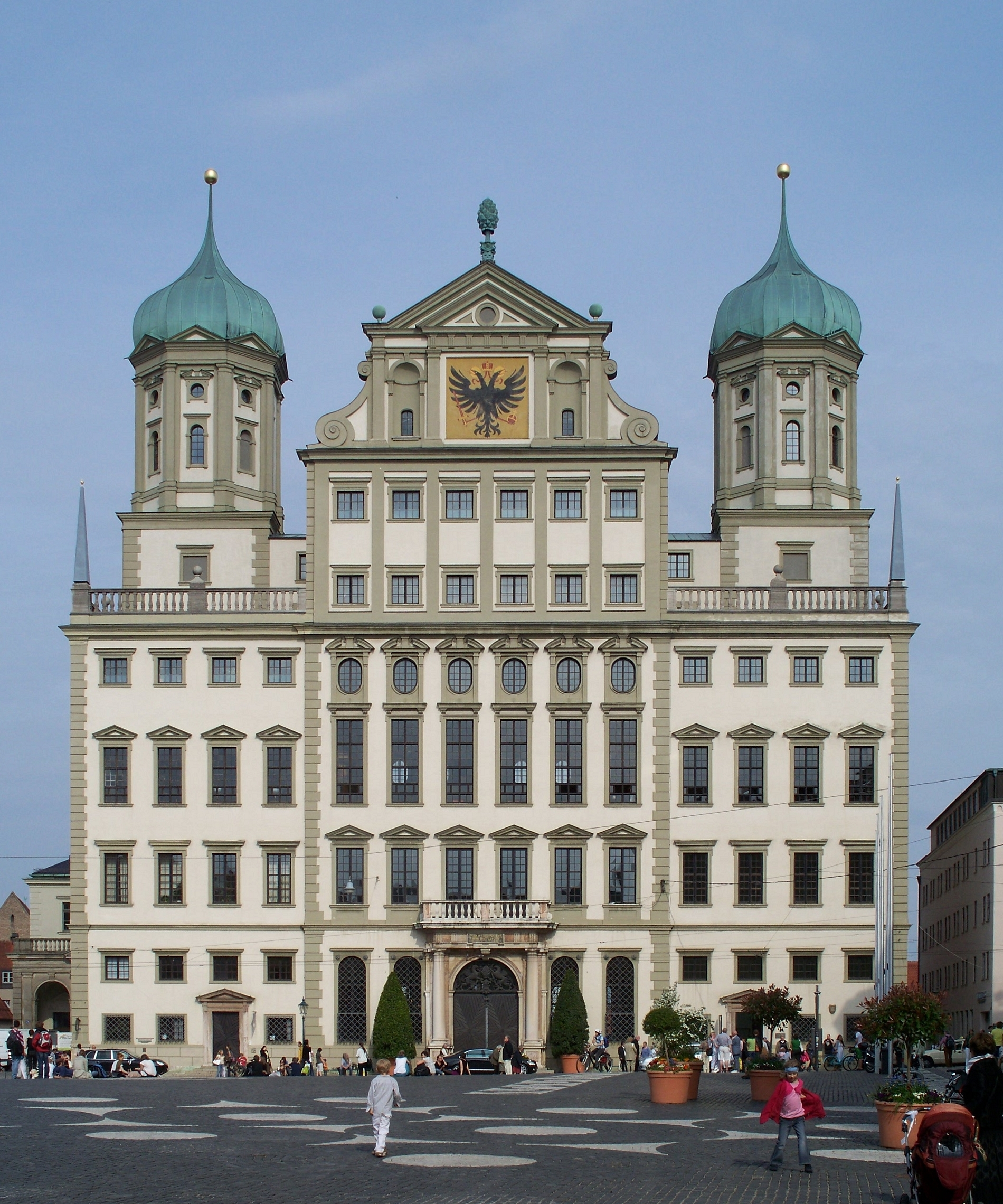
The Town Hall of Augsburg

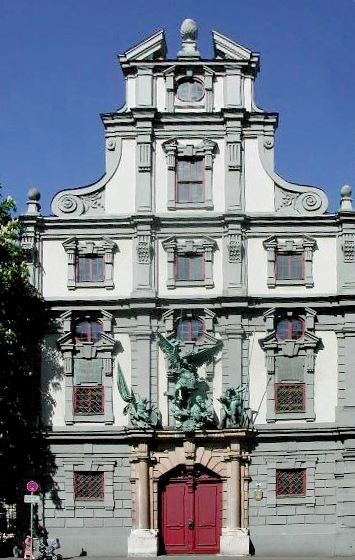
Zeughaus in Augsburg, designed by Elias Holl

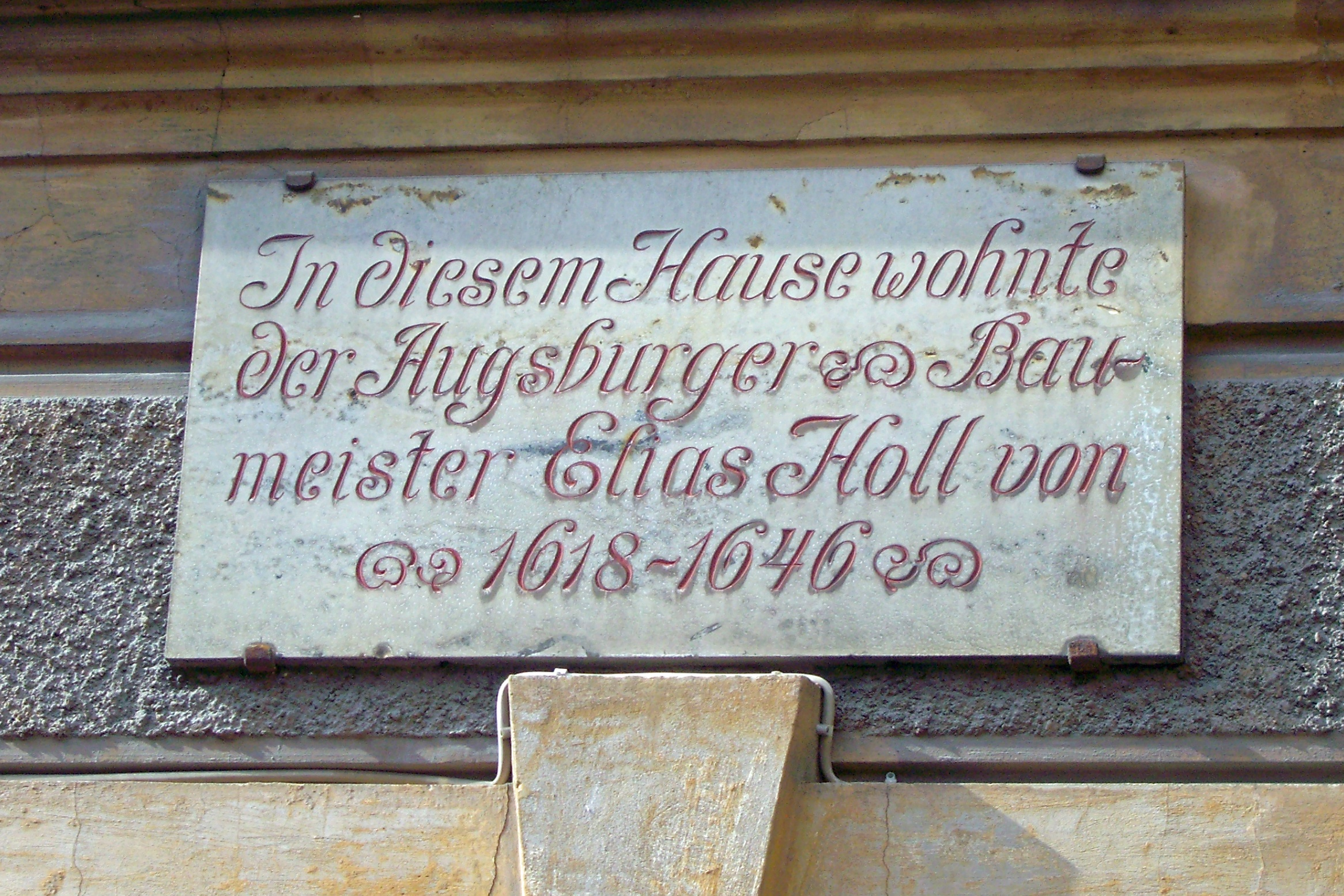
At Holl's house

Elias Holl (28 February 1573 in Augsburg – 6 January 1646 in Augsburg) was the most important architect of late German Renaissance architecture.

== Life ==
Elias Holl was born in Augsburg, Werbhausgasse 2. He was descended from a master-builder-Family. His father Hans Holl (1512-1594) taught him. In 1596 he passed the exam, the Meisterprüfung. After an abidance in Tyrol and Italy in the years 1600/1601 – he visited Bozen and Venice – in 1602 he became Werkmeister of Augsburg. In 1629 he lost his office as Stadtbaumeister because he was a protestant. Since then he was only called Stadtgeometer. He was dismissed from office in 1631. He is buried in the Augsburg Protestant Cemetery.

== Building ==
He was the architect and constructor of Augsburg's landmark: the Augsburg Town Hall. More buildings in Augsburg are Zeughaus (1602-1607), Wertachbrucker Tor (1605) Stadtmetzg (1609), St.-Anna-Gymnasium (1613), addition of the Perlachturm (1614-1616) and the Heilig-Geist-Spital (1626-1631) (it contains the Augsburger Puppenkiste).
