= Johann Georg Dominicus von Linprun =

Bavarian scientist

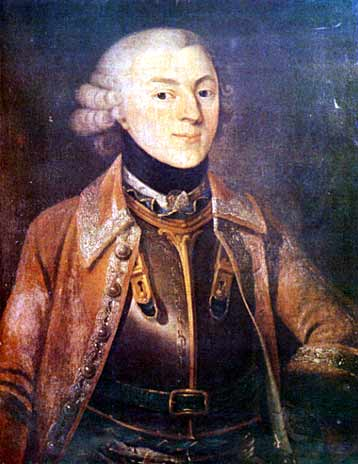
- Born: 10 January 1714; Viechtach, Bavaria
- Died: 14 June 1787 (aged 73); Munich, Bavaria
- Occupation: Mineralogist
- Known for: Bavarian Academy of Sciences

Johann Georg Dominicus von Linprun (Note: Linprun's name is also written Linbrunn, Limbrunn, Limbrun, Lindprun or Linprunn) (10 January 1714 - 14 June 1787) was a Bavarian scientist. He was one of the co-founders of the Bavarian Academy of Sciences.

== Early years ==
Johann Georg Dominicus von Linprun was born on 10 January 1714 in Viechtach in the Bavarian Forest, son of a municipal and district court clerk. After completing secondary school Linprun studied law and philosophy at the universities of Prague, Salzburg and Ingolstadt. On his return he obtained a position as a municipal court clerk first in Neumarkt and then in his home town of Viechtach. He married Maria Theresa Juliana Rettinger. Linprun was appointed Director of the lead and zinc mine at Rauschenberg near Dachsbach, and became the owner of a silver mine in Bodenmais.

== Mint ==
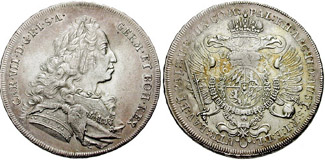
Bavarian Thaler of 1743. Agreement among the German states over weight and purity of coins was an ongoing issue.

Because Linprun had acquired a broad knowledge of mining and mineralogy, in 1750 he was appointed to the Mint and Mines office in Munich, and was often entrusted with negotiations over coinage. In 1753 (Note: The Allgemeine Deutsche Biographie gives the date of his knighthood as 1757. This appears to be an error. The Coin Convention between Bavaria and Austria was signed on 20 September 1753, establishing the standard Konventionstaler, later adopted by other German states.) he represented Bavaria in negotiations over monetary standards in Vienna, where he earned so much trust and respect that the Francis I, Holy Roman Emperor, made him a peer of the realm and the Empress Maria Theresa presented him with an image of her bust on a gold chain.

== Academy of Sciences ==
Linprun collaborated with provost Franz Töpsl, Andreas Felix von Oefele and Johann Georg von Lori for the foundation in 1759 of the Bavarian Academy of Sciences by Maximilian III Joseph, Elector of Bavaria. Linprun held the post of Director of the philosophical class at the Academy from 1759. The Academy published many treatises that he wrote, including a description of a measuring instrument he had invented; the discovery of a Roman road at Laufzorn and Grünwald; a description of the ancient geography of Bavaria; a memoir on the death of Jesus Christ. Linprun set up the first astronomical observatory for the Academy on his own initiative in a tower-like building on a bastion on the outskirts of Munich (today on Prinzregentenstraße opposite the Haus der Kunst). It was open from 1760 to 1769-70, but no serious observations were made.

In 1787 he was sent to a coinage conference at Ulm. He died of a stroke a few days after his return to Munich, on 14 June 1787.
