= Haimhausen =

- Municipality
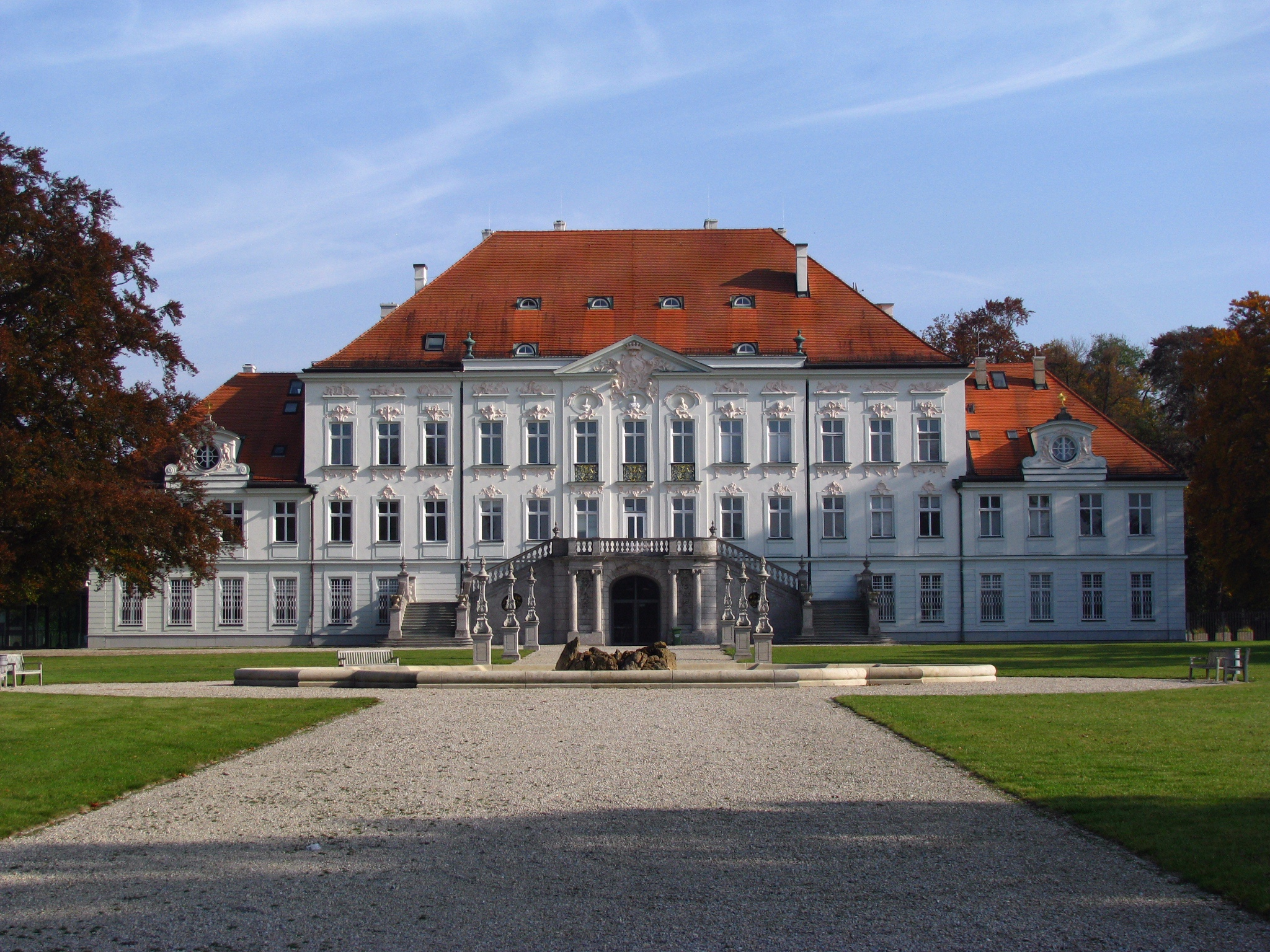
- Schloss Haimhausen

- Coat of arms

- Location of Haimhausen within Dachau district
- Interactive map of Haimhausen
- Location within Germany Location within Bavaria
- Coordinates: 48°19′N 11°34′E
- Country: Germany
- State: Bavaria
- Admin. region: Oberbayern
- District: Dachau
- Subdivisions: 8 Ortsteile

Government
  - Mayor (2020–26): Peter Felbermeier (CSU)

Area
  - Total: 26.73 km^{2} (10.32 sq mi)
- Elevation: 487 m (1,598 ft)

Population (2025-12-31)
  - Total: 5,715
  - Density: 213.8/km^{2} (553.8/sq mi)
- Time zone: UTC+01:00 (CET)
  - Summer (DST): UTC+02:00 (CEST)
- Postal codes: 85778
- Dialling codes: 08133
- Vehicle registration: DAH
- Website: www.haimhausen.de

Haimhausen is a municipality located on the Amper River in the district of Dachau in Bavaria, Germany, about 20 kilometres north of Munich.

== Geography ==
Haimhausen borders directly on a marshy area called the Dachauer Moos. The landscape around Haimhausen has springs, oxbow lakes, mossy fields, forests, bogs, swamps, and wild grass meadows. Some of the natural areas are still ecologically valuable and are home to rare plants and animals.

The following villages belong to the Haimhausen community: Amperpettenbach, Hörgenbach, Inhausen, Inhausermoos, Maisteig, Oberndorf, Ottershausen and Westerndorf.

== History ==
According to local legend, Haimhausen was founded by three brothers: Heimo, Petto and Indo, (which form the placenames Haimhausen, Amperpettenbach and Inhausen), these three villages are near each other.

Nevertheless, the area around Haimhausen may have been inhabited as far back as the Bronze Age.

Haimhausen first appeared on a document in AD 772 as 'Heiminhusir'. It one time had a court square (Schranne) in AD 829. Haimhausen had always been a noble estate since the Middle Ages. The complicated ownership of land showed transfers of estates from various noble houses. A simple castle or manor house (Schloss) was first mentioned in the late 13th century. The first record of a Catholic church (St. Nikolaus) was in 1485.

Haimhausen was in the middle of hereditary feuds by various Bavarian ducal houses in the late Middle Ages, especially the House of Wittelsbach. On August 5, 1504, during the War of the Succession of Landshut (Landshuter Erbfolgekrieg) Haimhausen was burnt to the ground.

During the Thirty Years War, Haimhausen was severely damage by the invading Swedes in 1632 during their march to Munich, followed by a plague in 1633/1634. Then later in the war, the town was attacked again by Swedes and French in 1648, and again decimated by plague in 1649. The manor house/castle was rebuilt in 1660.

By the mid-18th century, the castle came under the ownership of Count Sigmund von Haimhausen. He would later be the founding president of the Bavarian Academy of Sciences, and the Nymphenburg Porcelain Factory.

Haimhausen had a 400 year-old beer brewery until it closed in 2019 and converted into a Wirtshaus/Restaurant, (Schlossbrauerei Haimhausen).

The modern community of Haimhausen, as a municipality, was created during the Bavarian Administrative Reforms of 1818.

By the late 19th century, Haimhausen and the surrounding villages became a magnate for artists to sketch and paint portraits of the various landscapes. In 1895, the artist Bernhard Buttersack began an artists colony, similar to one in Dachau. He founded an art studio in Ottershausen to teach his students. By the 1920s, the artist Max Bergmann moved to Haimhausen and taught students for 30 years. His students included Arthur Niso, Helene Harth, Alice Krüger and Hermann Koenemann. With the death of Paul Erbe in 1972, the small art colony vanished.

Near the end of the Second World War, units of the U.S. Army passed through Haimhausen and the surrounding areas in late April 1945, shortly before the liberation of Dachau and Munich.

In 1998, Haimhausen Castle became the location of the Bavarian International School. The school is designed to cater to children/teens of English-speaking expatriates and professionals from all over the world for short-term work in the Munich area.

In 2018, St. Nikolaus Church was renovated at a cost of about 4 million euros.

In May 2026, Haimhausen celebrated the 155th anniversary of the founding of their local fire department. The highlight of the event was a comedy night with political cabaretist Wolfgang Krebs.

== Businesses and Services ==
Haimhausen has several shops and restaurants on its main streets: including a bike shop, post office, flower shop, butcher, bakery, shoe shop, ice-cream parlor, mini-supermarket and Shell petrol station. Not to mention the Rathaus (City Hall), a bank, a sportsclub (SV Haimhausen), driving school, elementary and middle-school, pharmacy and several medical/dental clinics. It has its own motorway exit on the Autobahn A99. Haimhausen also has an adventure playground and skatepark.

The current Mayor (Bürgermeister) of Haimhausen is Stefan Jänicke-Spicker (Local Citizens Party, since 2026).

A small hydropower facility on the Amper, between Haimhausen and Ottershausen, has been in operation since 1902 and sells renewable electricity to local customers.

== Objects of interest ==
- Description of the Schlosskapelle
- Description of the church St.Martin in Amperpettenbach
- Description of the church St.Peter und Paul in Westerndorf
- Description of the Stidlkapelle in Oberndorf
