= Johann Georg von Lori =

Bavarian high official, lawyer and historian

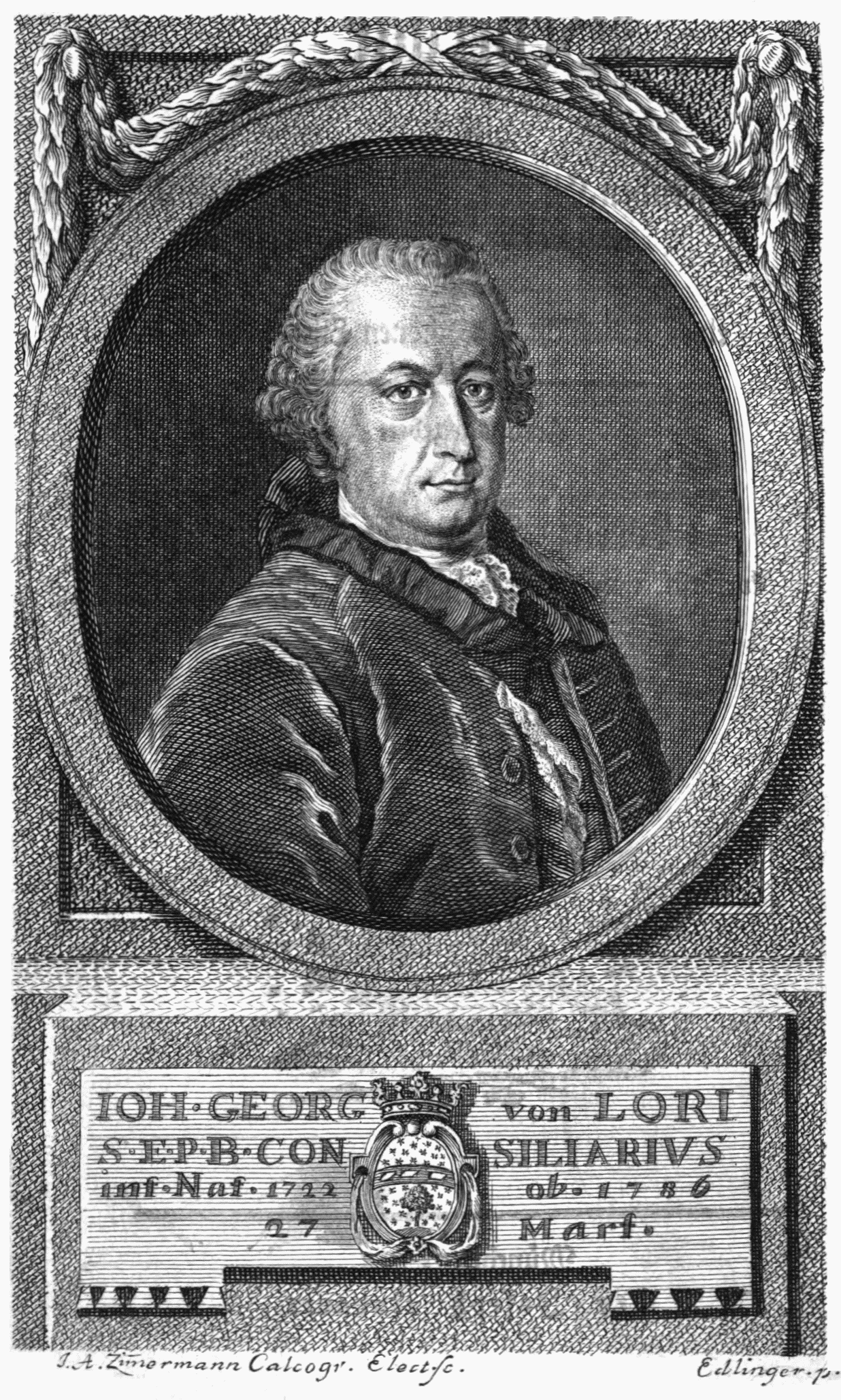
- Copper engraving by Joseph Anton Zimmermann after a painting by Johann Georg Edlinger
- Born: 17 July 1723; Steingaden, Bavaria
- Died: 23 March 1787 (aged 63); Neuburg an der Donau, Bavaria
- Occupation: Lawyer

Johann Georg von Lori (17 July 1723 – 23 March 1787) was a Bavarian high official, lawyer and historian. He was the driving force behind the foundation of the Bavarian Academy of Sciences and Humanities in 1759.

== Life ==
=== Early years ===
Johann Georg von Lori was born on 17 July 1723 in the Gründl Inn near Steingaden, Bavaria, a property of the former Premonstratensian Steingaden Abbey. His family was Italian in origin, but had settled in Bavaria at the time of the Welf dukes. He attended elementary school at the monastery, then studied at the Jesuit Gymnasium in Augsburg. The wealthy Augsburg patrician and later mayor Jakob Wilhelm Benedikt von Langenmantel was one of the financial sponsors of his education.

In 1740 Lori became a law student in Dillingen, and in 1744 moved on to Würzburg. In Würzburg Lori was influenced by the new ideas of the Age of Enlightenment. He studied under Professor Johann Caspar Barthel, who was impressed by energy and ambition of the young man. Lori went on to the University of Ingolstadt, where Professor Johann Adam von Ickstatt recognized his great ability and in 1746 made him a legal tutor. In 1748 Lori wrote a doctorate in the University of Ingolstadt for Johann Georg Weishaupt.

=== University of Ingolstadt ===
In 1749 Lori was appointed professor of criminal law and legal history at Ingolstad. He met the Prince of Hohenlohe-Bartenstein, with whom he discussed the rationalist philosophy of Christian Wolff and Johann Gottlieb Heineccius. In September 1750 he was given the opportunity to travel to Italy. He obtained a one-year sabbatical and a scholarship of 400 fl from the university, and left in the second half of November 1750. He traveled via Venice and Ferrara to Rome. He heard there of the collection of documents from the Bibliotheca Palatina that Maximilian I had sent to Pope Gregory XV after the fall of Heidelberg. He managed to obtain permission to access the collection and make a catalog. On 7 July shortly before leaving Rome, he had a short audience with Pope Benedict XIV.

After his return, as a sympathizer of Wolff's philosophy he came into renewed conflict with the Jesuits of the Jesuit College of Ingolstadt. The dispute had already flared before his trip to Italy. The Jesuits, who dominated the university, confiscated a copy of Johann Paul Reinhard's "Introduction to the history of the states of Europe" on the grounds that it was heretical, and banned him from teaching. Lori refused to recognize the ban, saying he held his post from the Elector, not from the Jesuits. In July 1750 he wrote to his friend Andreas Felix von Oefele complaining of the lack of true scholarship at the university. The disputes escalated and eventually led to him being forced to leave the university in 1752. His friends managed to get him appointed a Councillor in Munich.

=== Later career ===
In 1752 Lori was appointed to the Mint and Mining College in Munich. In the summer of 1755 he made a long trip to the Austrian states and central Germany. He found Prague disappointing, but was impressed by Berlin and Potsdam. In Leipzig he was admitted to the Society of Liberal Arts. In 1756 he traveled extensively in Switzerland on official business, returning the next year. He then began to plan the establishment of an academy similar to those he had seen on North Germany, based on the work of the earlier Parnassus boicus society of Munich.

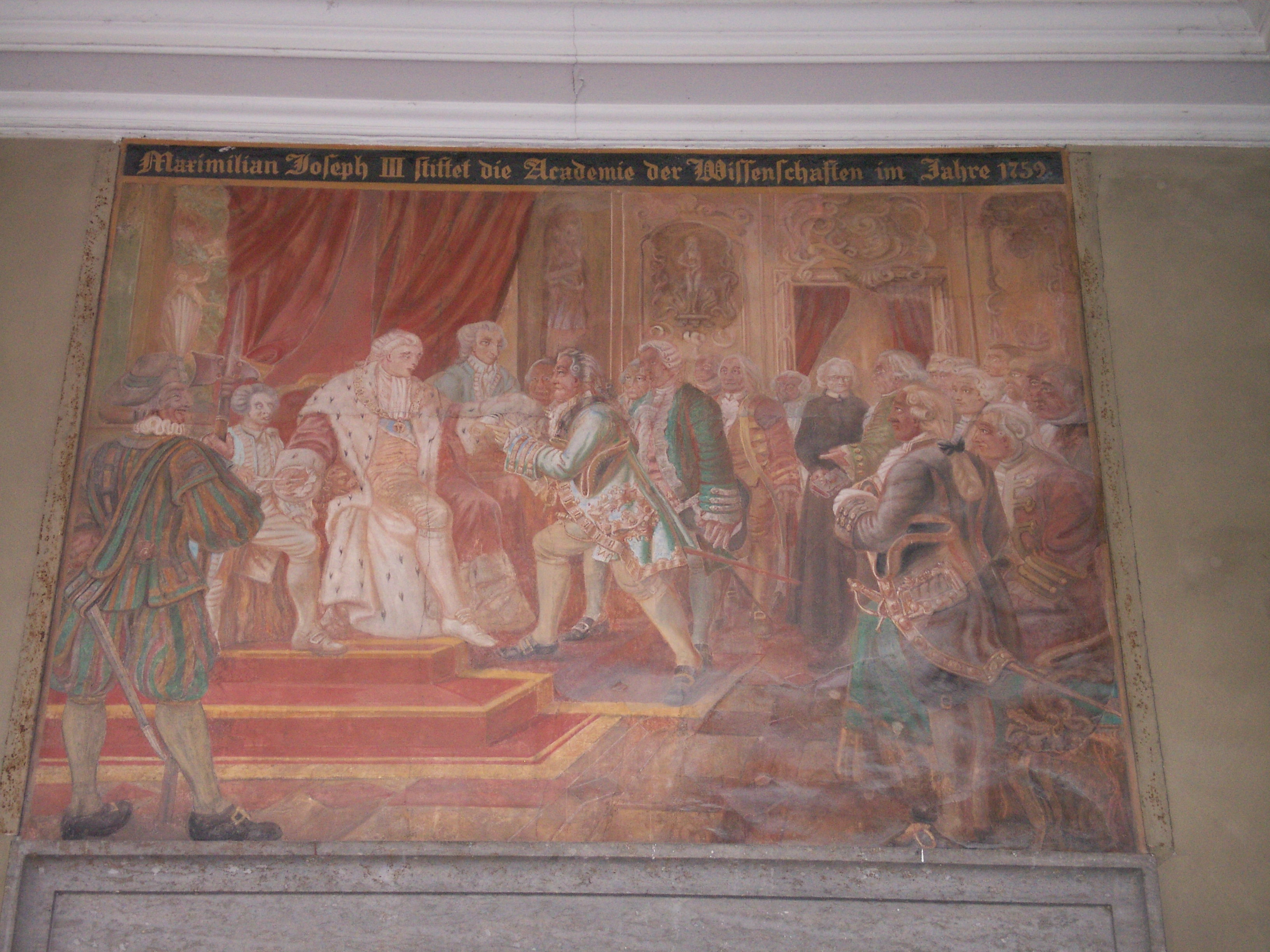
Maximilian III Joseph founding the Bavarian Academy of Sciences and Humanities (Staatskanzlei in Munich)

Lori put great effort into the establishment of the Bavarian Academy of Sciences and Humanities. On 12 October 1758 he founded the Bayerische Gelehrte Gesellschaft (Bavarian Scholarly Society) in Munich. The first president was the Chairman of the Mint and Mining Commission, Sigmund von Haimhausen, who brought the society to the attention of the court and the Elector. Within six months the society had 88 members. On 28 March 1759 Maximilian III Joseph, Elector of Bavaria, signed the founding charter, which was confirmed on 25 June 1759. The charter specifically mentioned the earlier Bavarian learned society, the Parnassus Boicus, which had published a learned journal until 1740. In the new Academy Lori held the important position of secretary until 1761. Other founding members were provost Franz Töpsl, Andreas Felix von Oefele and Johann Georg Dominicus von Linprun.

The Academy was soon the object of attacks from the Jesuits and their allies. On 27 March 1761 Lori was relieved of his position as secretary. He was involved with the peace negotiations with Prussia in 1762-63 at the end of the Seven Years' War. In 1764 he was a member of the Bavarian delegation to Frankfurt for the imperial election. After his return he was given charge of the public electoral archives. In 1768 Lori became a member of the Privy Council and foreign affairs adviser. On 23 July 1773 Pope Clement XIV dissolved the Jesuits. Lori was given the job of taking over the Bavarian archives, which he undertook tactfully. In 1776 he was appointed to supervise the Faculty of Law at the University of Ingolstadt. After the Elector Maximilian III Joseph died on 30 December 1777, the Austrians raised claims over territories in Lower Bavaria. Lori was employed in secret investigations and discussions over the claims during the War of the Bavarian Succession (July 1778 – 21 May 1779).

Lori was dismissed on 12 June 1779, shortly after the signature of the peace treaty. Charles Theodore, Elector of Bavaria relieved him of his office and he retired to Neuburg an der Donau. He died there on 23 March 1787 of a chest infection, aged 63.

== Work ==
Lori published several historical works. His History of Lechrain appeared in 1765. Count Sigmund von Haimhausen, the leader of the mint and mining industry in Bavaria, let Lori write on the historical development of Bavarian mining law and mining.
