= Edgar Haniel von Haimhausen =

German diplomat

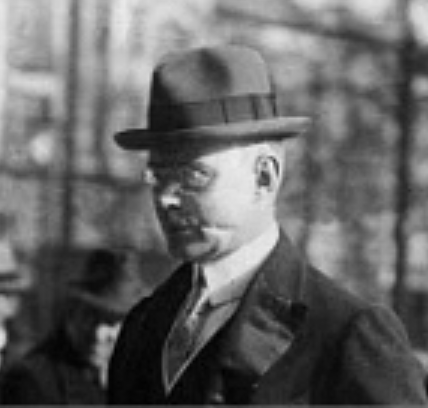
Edgar Haniel von Haimhausen

Edgar Haniel von Haimhausen (12 December 1870 in Ruhrort (now Duisburg) –14 January 1935 in Munich) was a German diplomat.

== Life ==
Edgar Haniel von Haimhausen was born in Ruhrort as the son of the landlord Max Berthold Haimhausen and his wife Clara née Haniel. His upbringing at home was based on the values of the Protestant faith. Due to the early death of his father, he grew up with his stepfather Emil Uhles.

After studying Jurisprudence at the University of Bonn Haniel joined the diplomatic service and in 1900 he was called up to the Foreign Office. His first foreign assignment took him to the German legation in Brussels. He began his service in Belgium and subsequently served in Tangier, Paris, Constantinople, Bern, Rio de Janeiro, Athens, London and Washington, D.C. In the USA, he maintained close contact with Franz von Papen (1879-1969), who had arrived in Washington in December 1913 and had built up an espionage and sabotage network that violated neutrality efforts under cover of his diplomatic activities in the United States. From January 1917, Haniel von Haimhausen held the character of envoy. However, on February 15, 1917, the U.S. declaration of war against Germany led to the termination of diplomatic relations.

After returning to Berlin, Haniel was initially assigned to Department IA (Politics) in the Foreign Office, and in April 1917 he became in charge of the United States of America, Cuba, Mexico and the Philippines departments. From November 16, 1918, he was a member of the Armistice Commission in Spa as a representative of the Political Department and in 1919, he headed the political commission of the German peace delegation meeting in Versailles, which participated in the negotiations for the Versailles Peace Treaty. He then became Undersecretary of State in July, then State Secretary for Political Affairs in the Foreign Office from May 20, 1920.

As State Secretary (ret.), Edgar Haniel von Haimhausen became the Reich government's representative to the Bavarian government in Munich as late as December 1922 and filled the position of representative of the Reich government in Munich until 1931. His assignment as envoy ended in March, and he retired in mid-1933. He died at the age of 64.

== Family ==
The Haniels owned the Schloss Haimhausen near Munich. As King of Prussia, Wilhelm II elevated the family to hereditary Prussian nobility in 1905. Haniel was first married to Margarete von Brauchitsch, and in second marriage with Hedwig von Branca née Frankenburger, the mother of architect Alexander Freiherr von Branca.

In 1891 he was accepted into the Corps Palatia Bonn.
