= Polling monastery library =

The former Polling monastery library was once the second largest library in Bavaria, after the Munich court library. It belonged to the Polling Abbey which was dissolved during secularisation in Bavaria. Around 1631, its number of books was still relatively small and mainly from the area of theology. The greatest growth rates of books were during the era of provost Franz Töpsl during the Age of Enlightenment. Before provost Töpsel, 20,000 volumes were shelved in the library. A large proportion of the books of 80,000 volumes were given to today's Bavarian State Library and the Ingolstadt University Library. In these books were included 653 manuscripts and 1394 incunabula.

The impressive library hall is now used for concerts and events. The library was built from 1776 to 1778. The master builder of the library was Matthias Bader, the ceiling fresco was painted by Johann Baader, and the stucco was by Thassilo Zopf. After secularisation, around 1814, the Streicher family bought the building, who used the large hall as storage. During the Second World War about 800 paintings of the Bavarian State Painting Collections were stored here, some of them very valuable. In November 1971, members of the Rotary Club of Weilheim founded a club to renovate the library hall and make it available to the public. Since 1975, the hall has been regularly used for classical concerts. Several hundred concerts have already been held here.
