= Parnassus Boicus =

Organization

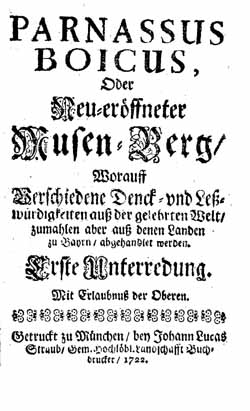
- First edition of the Parnassus Boicus journal, from 1722
- Formation: 1722
- Type: Learned society
- Headquarters: Munich, Bavaria
- Region served: Southern Germany
- Official language: German

The Parnassus Boicus (Bavarian Mountain Muse) was a Bavarian learned society founded in 1722, and the name of a journal published by the society.

== Origins ==
The society was based on a plan started in 1720 by three Augustinian fathers. Eusebius Amort (1692–1775) was a leading theologian and an opponent of the Jesuits. Gelasius Hieber (1671–1731) was a famous preacher in the German language. Agnellus Kandler (1692–1745) was a genealogist and librarian. The initial plans fell through, but in 1722 they issued the first edition of the Parnassus Boicus, communicating interesting information from the arts and sciences.

== Journal ==
The scientific periodical Parnassus Boicus began publication in Munich in 1722. The Parnassus Boicus oder Neu-eröffneter Musen-Berg continued publishing until 1740. Between 1722 and 1727 twenty-four issues of the journal appeared, published sporadically. The first issue had issues about Bavarian topography, rulers and ancient laws. Subsequent issues had much broader scope.

In a three-part article that appeared in 1723–24 the journal defended the German language for its periodic and heroic (Heldensprache) qualities. The journal pioneered scientific methods in Germany, with an emphasis on experimental verification. For example, in 1725 the journal published an article attacking alchemy, claiming to give fundamental proof that it was impossible to make gold. Although alchemy remained widely accepted for some time, the investigations proposed by the Parnassus Boicus would destroy the hermetic concepts that it rested on.

Franz Josef Grienwaldt (1708–1743) was a student of Johann Adam Morasch (1682–1734) and Johann Jakob Treiling (1681–1758), professors of medicine at the University of Ingolstadt. Grienwaldt moved to the Protestant University of Altdorf, and received his doctorate in 1732. On the recommendation of Andreas Elias Büchner he was accepted as a member of the Leopoldina Academy. From 1736 to 1740 he was editor of the Parnassus boicus.

== Influence ==
Although the society closed in 1740, it had lasting impact. On 12 October 1758 the lawyer Johann Georg Lori (1723–1787), Privy Counsellor at the College of Coinage and Mining in Munich, founded the Bayerische Gelehrte Gesellschaft (Learned Society of Bavaria). This led to the foundation on 28 March 1769 of the Bavarian Academy of Sciences and Humanities, with Count Sigmund von und zu Haimhausen as the first president. The academy's foundation charter specifically mentions the Parnassus Boicus.
