= Eusebius Amort =

German Roman Catholic theologian

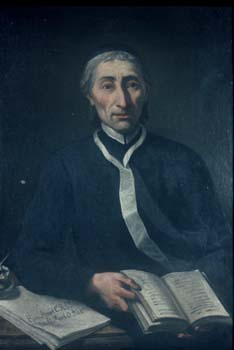
Eusebius Amort

Eusebius Amort (November 15, 1692 – February 5, 1775) was a German Roman Catholic theologian.

== Life ==
Amort was born at Bibermuhle, near Tolz, in Upper Bavaria. He studied at the Jesuit College in Munich, and at an early age joined the Canons Regular at Polling, where, shortly after his ordination in 1717, he taught theology and philosophy. The Parnassus Boicus learned society was based on a plan started in 1720 by three Augustinian fathers: Eusebius Amort, Gelasius Hieber (1671–1731), a famous preacher in the German language and Agnellus Kandler (1692–1745), a genealogist and librarian. The initial plans fell through, but in 1722 they issued the first volume of the Parnassus Boicus journal, covering topics in the arts and sciences.

An academy formed by him at Polling became in time the model on which was based the Academy of Sciences of Munich.

In 1733 Amort went to Rome as theologian to Cardinal Niccolo Maria Lercari (died 1757). He returned to Polling in 1735 and devoted the rest of his life to the revival of learning in Bavaria. He died at Polling in 1775.

== Works ==
Amort, who had the reputation of being the most learned man of his age, was a voluminous writer on every conceivable subject, from poetry to astronomy, from dogmatic theology to mysticism. His best known works are:

- A manual of theology in 4 vols, Theologia eclectica, moralis et scholastica (Augsburg, 1752; revised by Pope Benedict XIV for the 1753 edition published at Bologna)
- A defence of Catholic doctrine, entitled Demonstratio critica religionis Catholicae (Augsburg, 1751)
- A work on indulgences, which has often been criticized by Protestant writers, De Origine, Progressu, Valore, et Fructu Indulgentiorum (Augsburg, 1735)
- The astronomical work Nova philosophiae planetarum et artis criticae systemata (Nuremberg, 1723).

A treatise on mysticism, De Revelationibus et Visionibus, etc. (2 vols, Augsburg 1744) was directed against the "Mystic City of God," by the Spanish Franciscan nun, Maria de Agreda, and brought him into conflict with several of her Franciscan defenders.

The list of his other works, including his three erudite contributions to the question of authorship of the Imitatio Christi, will be found in C. Toussaint's scholarly article in Alfred Vacant's Dictionnaire de theologie (1900, cols 1115–1117).
