= Johann Georg Weishaupt =

German law professor (1717-1753)

- Born: 24 April 1717; Brilon, Westphalia, Prussia
- Died: 20 September 1753 (aged 36); Heiligenthal near Würzburg, Bavaria
- Occupation: Lawyer

Johann Georg Weishaupt (24 April 1717 – 20 September 1753) was a German professor of law at the University of Ingolstadt.

Weishaupt was born in Brilon in the Prussian government district of Arnsberg in Westphalia. He studied law in the University of Würzburg under Johann Adam von Ickstatt (1702–1776). He received a doctorate in law in 1743 and began to teach at the university. His dissertation was on Dissertatio Juris Publici Universalis De Summo Imperio Atque Inde Descendente Jure, Obligatione, & Potestate.

Johann Adam von Ickstatt became a professor of law at the University of Ingolstadt in 1746. Weishaupt also moved from Würzburg to the University of Ingolstadt. Ickstatt had him appointed professor of imperial institutions and criminal law by decree of 14 October 1746. He held this position until his death. One of his pupils was the future historian Johann Georg von Lori, who wrote a doctorate in the University of Ingolstadt in 1748.

Weishaupt died suddenly while on holiday on 20 September 1753 in Heiligenthal near Würzburg. Weishaupt's son, Adam Weishaupt, was born on 6 February 1748 in Ingolstadt, and was just five years old when his father died. Johann Adam von Ickstatt, also a professor of law at the University of Ingolstadt and Adam's godfather, took over Adam Weishaupt's upbringing.
