= Schloss Haimhausen =

- Haimhausen, Bavaria
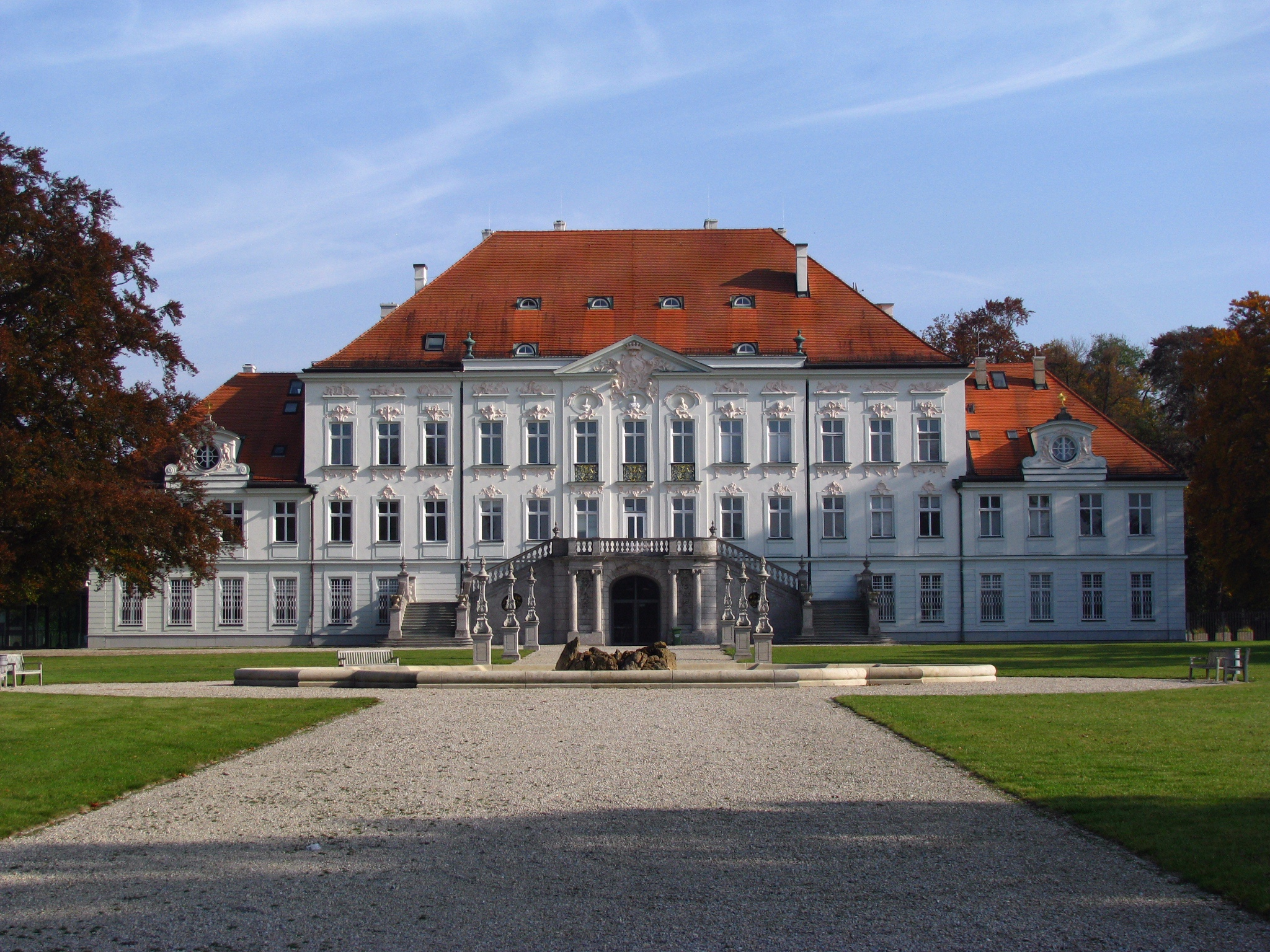
- Schloss Haimhausen

Site information
- Type: Schloss

Location
- Location in Germany Schloss Haimhausen (Germany)
- Coordinates: 48.313056°N 11.545833°E

Schloss Haimhausen is a Schloss in the Bavarian town of Haimhausen, Germany.

== History ==
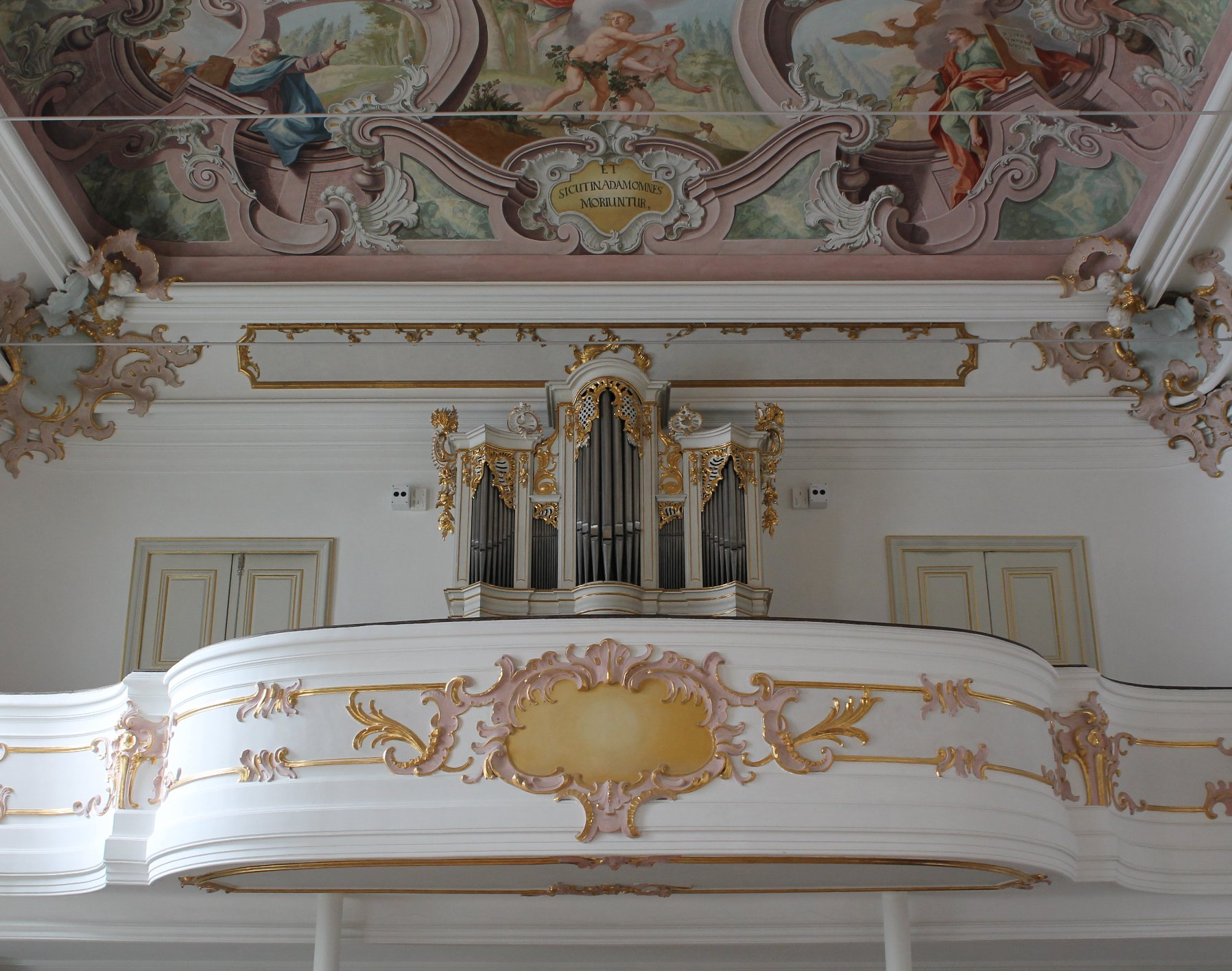
View of the interior of the chapel

The site has been the location of a castle since at least 1281, when it was mentioned in written sources. This first castle was however destroyed during the Thirty Years' War and not rebuilt until 1660. At that time, a Baroque palace was built on the site, the core of the present structure. It was rebuilt from 1747 to 1750 in a Rococo style, and has remained largely unchanged since. During this time, the estate belonged to Count Sigmund von Haimhausen, an industrialist, politician and co-founder of the Bavarian Academy of Sciences and Humanities who however died without heirs. After his death, the estate was sold to James Eduard Haniel. Descendants of Haniel still run a brewery located adjacent to the Schloss. The park of the estate was transformed into an English landscape garden during the ownership of Haniel. In 1794 it was sold again. It remained a family home until the 1930s, when the expensive upkeep of the buildings led to its abandonment as a home. During World War II, thousands of books from the Bavarian State Library were housed in the palace chapel. After the war, the building has served several different purposes. It is today owned by the Bavarian International School. The buildings are used for education and hence not open to the public.

== Architecture ==
The appearance of the Schloss today is characterised by the reconstruction during the 18th century. The architect responsible for the rebuilding was François de Cuvilliés. He created the presently visible exterior and several of the interiors; during the reconstruction the house was also substantially enlarged. Among the interiors, the banqueting hall on the second floor, the so-called Golden Room and the chapel are especially noteworthy. The banqueting hall contains a ceiling painting depicting the four seasons, by Johann Georg Bergmüller, and two tile stoves from the Nymphenburg Porcelain Manufactory. Bergmüller also decorated the ceiling of the Golden Room, whose other decorations were designed by Cuvilliés. The chapel was decorated by both Bergmüller and Egid Verhelst and his sons. The building was restored during the 1980s and another renovation was carried out in 1997-1998.
