= Franz Töpsl =

Bavarian Augustinian Canon Regular

- Born: 18 November 1711; Munich, Bavaria
- Died: 12 March 1796 (aged 84); Munich, Bavaria
- Occupation: Provost
- Known for: Biographies

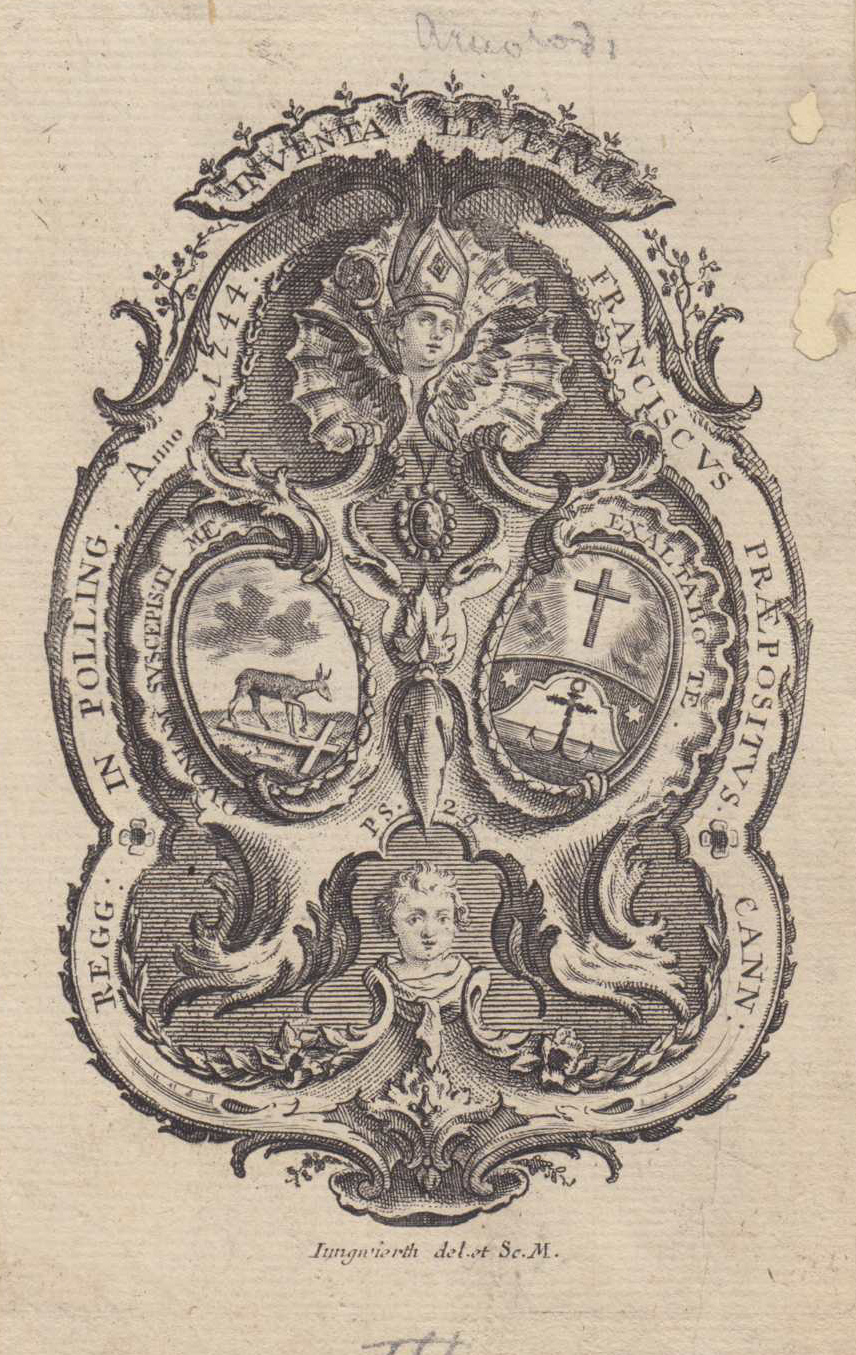
Ex libris, Augustinian Canons of Polling Abbey, Provost Franz Töpsl

Franz Töpsl (18 November 1711 – 12 March 1796) was an Augustinian Canon Regular, provost of Polling Abbey, historian and librarian.

== Life ==
Franz Joachim Joseph Martin Töpsl was born in Munich, Bavaria on the night of 17–18 November 1711. In 1729 he entered the Polling Abbey of Augustinian Canons Regular near Weilheim in Oberbayern. On 16 April 1744 he was elected provost there. During an administration of almost 52 years he attempted to improve the abbey through upgrading the educational institute and systematically expanding the library.

The lawyer Johann Georg von Lori founded the Bayerische Gelehrte Gesellschaft (Learned Society of Bavaria) on 12 October 1758. This led to the foundation by Maximilian III Joseph, Elector of Bavaria of the Bavarian Academy of Sciences and Humanities on 28 March 1759. Count Sigmund von Haimhausen was the first president. Franz Töpsl became a member of the academy that year. He later supplied scientific instruments to the academy.

From 1773 he was a Country Deputy (Deputirter der Landschaft), and from 1781 in charge of state education. In his spare time he compiled Scriptores ordinis canonicorum regularium S. Augustini, biographical and bibliographical works about writers belonging to his order. He also wrote a historical outline of his abbey.

Franz Töpsl died suddenly on 12 March 1796 in Munich.

== Portrait collection ==
The archive of the Ludwig-Maximilians-Universität München holds a collection of about 90 portraits of Augustinian canons, acquired after the secularization of the Bavarian monasteries in 1803. They are unframed, in poor condition, and have no identification of the subjects. It turns out that they originated when Franz Töpsl asked for portraits of writers of his order from across Europe. He had the originals repainted in standard format, then placed in frames that held the name of the canon. The portraits were hung in the abbey. By comparison to his unpublished Encyclopedia of the writers of the order of Augustinian Canons it has been possible to identify almost all the subjects.
