= Jakob Wilhelm Benedikt von Langenmantel =

Patrician

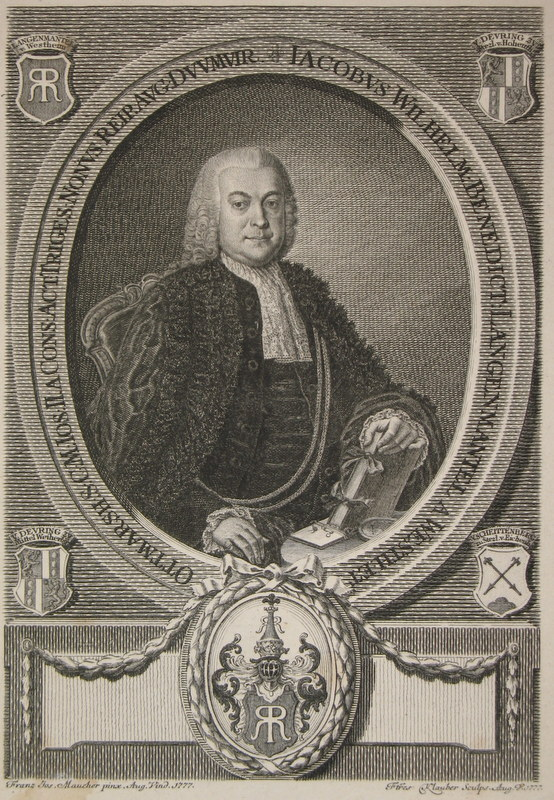
- Jakob Wilhelm Benedikt von Langenmantel by Johann Baptist Klauber, Augsburg, 1777
- Born: 16 March 1720; Augsburg, Bavaria
- Died: 17 April 1790 (aged 70); Augsburg, Bavaria
- Occupation: Patrician

Jakob Wilhelm Benedikt von Langenmantel (16 March 1720 – 17 April 1790), also called Jakob Wilhelm Benedikt Langenmantel von Westheim und Ottmarshausen, was a patrician of the city of Augsburg in the Electorate of Bavaria, and mayor of the city.

== Life and work ==
Jakob Wilhelm Benedikt von Langenmantel was son of Joseph Wilhelm von Langenmantel and his wife Maria Juliana von Deuring zu Stätzling und Hohenthann. Langenmantel attended the Jesuit school of St. Salvator in Augsburg at the same time as Leopold Mozart, father of Wolfgang Amadeus Mozart. They were close friends and in 1737 they both went to Salzburg to study philosophy.

In Augsburg on 12 January 1744 Langenmantel married Josepha Margaretha Walburga Baronin Scharffeder von Rickerting zu Kollersaich und Schöllnach. In 1743 he was the patrician senator of the city government. In 1757 he was made responsible for the defense of the city. In 1761 he was Ungeldherr, the administrator of municipal taxation. In 1774 he was a member of the Imperial Privy Council, and mayor of the city and surroundings. He remained in this office until his death in 1790.

During a visit to Augsburg, Wolfgang Amadeus Mozart was presented to von Langenmantel by his uncle, who waited on the upstairs landing during the interview. Mozart complained to his father about the treatment, but Leopold Mozart shrugged it off, and pointed out that although haughty the patricians were generally also quite poor compared to lower-class merchants. Langenmantel, along with the physician Georg Friedrich Gutermann (father of Sophie von La Roche), was an enthusiastic member of the Augsburg Science Society. His brother Franz Joseph Ignaz Langenmantel, head of the Benedictine Abbey in the city, persuaded him to be the financial sponsor of the future historian Johann Georg von Lori.

In 1777 Langenmantel and his wife expanded and renovated the Langenmantel Chapel (Saints Cosmas and Damian) in Westheim (Neusäß), and equipped it with a new high altar. This is recorded on a panel in the church today.

Langenmantel died unexpectedly, at home, in the evening 17 April 1790 from a stroke. The funeral took place on 21 April at the Catholic city cemetery. On 23 April a solemn requiem was held for the mayor in the church of St. Moritz, Augsburg, For two weeks the military wore a black armband.
