= Anton Clemens von Toerring-Seefeld =

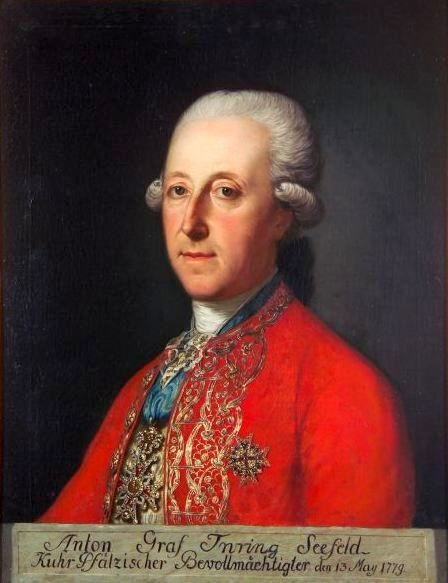
c. 1779

Anton Clemens Graf von Törring-Seefeld or in English form as Count Anton Clemens von Törring zu Seefeld (22 June 1725 – 6 February 1812) was a Bavarian noble, privy councillor who served as a president of the court and of the Bavarian Academy of Sciences from 1793 to 1807. He was also a member of the Bavarian Illuminati. He was a writer of plays, comedies, and poetry in addition to some works on the protection of meadows.

== Biography ==
Anton Clemens was born in Munich in noble Törring family, son of the Bavarian Field Marshal Ignaz von Törring. The family had served under five rulers and he was born during the reign of Elector Maximilian Emanuel. He served in the Bavarian military from 1741 until 1755 for twelve years in the Törring Regiment and rose to the rank of captain. He then left military service, married Emanuela Maria Josepha née Sedlnitzka von Choltitz (1740–1790) and went to manage his properties. In 1779 he became privy councillor for Elector Karl Theodor. In 1789 he founded an agricultural society in Seefeld. He was involved in political activism which was considered progressive for the period and served as a president of the Bavarian Academy of Sciences from 1793 to 1807. He was a member of the Bavarian Illuminati (under the pseudonym "Ulysses") and a freemason of the Lodge St. Theodor zum guten Rat.

His writings included:

- Die Belagerung der Stadt d'Aubigny: Ein heroisches Schauspiel in fünf Aufzügen - a heroic drama
- Die Majestät in der Klemme : Ein Originaltrauerspiel in fünf Aufzügen - another heroic drama
- Von der Nutzbarkeit der Wiesen, und des Heuwuchses - on the use and protection of meadows
