= Adam Weishaupt =

German philosopher and founder of the Bavarian Illuminati (1748–1830)

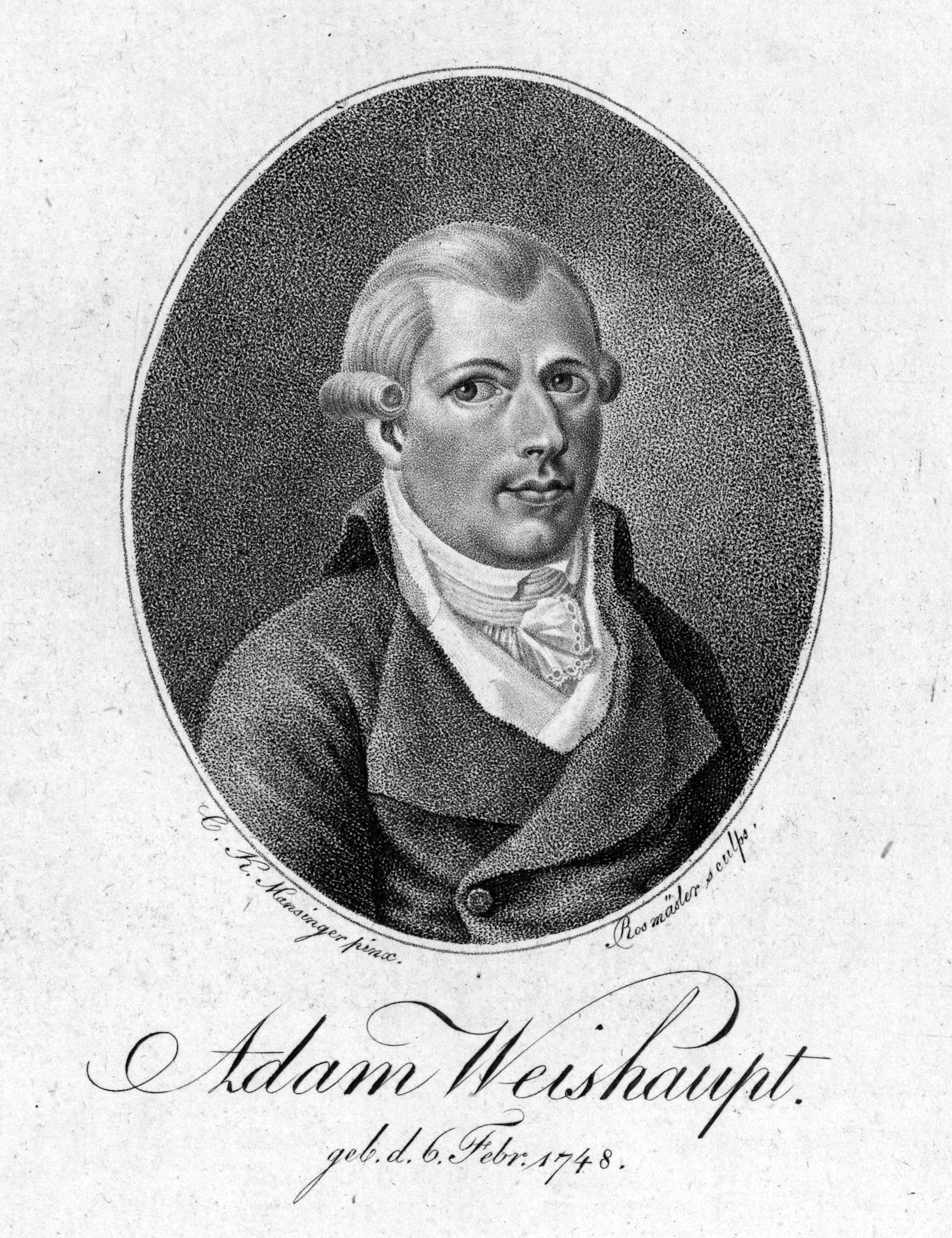
- 1799 portrait of Weishaupt
- Born: Johann Adam Weishaupt; 6 February 1748; Ingolstadt, Electorate of Bavaria, Holy Roman Empire
- Died: 18 November 1830 (aged 82); Gotha, Saxe-Coburg-Gotha, German Confederation
- Known for: Founder of the Illuminati

Education
- Education: University of Ingolstadt
- Academic advisor: Johann Adam von Ickstatt

Philosophical work
- Era: Age of Enlightenment
- Region: Western philosophy
- School: Empiricism
- Institutions: University of Ingolstadt
- Main interests: Epistemology, ethics, philosophy of religion
- Notable ideas: Human perfectibility

Johann Adam Weishaupt (German: [ˈjoːhan ˈaːdam ˈvaɪshaʊpt]; 6 February 1748 – 18 November 1830) was a German philosopher, professor of civil law and later canon law, and founder of the Bavarian Illuminati.

== Early life ==
Adam Weishaupt was born on 6 February 1748 in Ingolstadt in the Electorate of Bavaria. Weishaupt's father Johann Georg Weishaupt (1717–1753) died when Adam was five years old. After his father's death he came under the tutelage of his godfather Johann Adam von Ickstatt who, like his father, was a professor of law at the University of Ingolstadt. Ickstatt was a proponent of the philosophy of Christian Wolff and of the Enlightenment, and he influenced the young Weishaupt with his rationalism. Weishaupt began his formal education at age seven at a Jesuit school. He later enrolled at the University of Ingolstadt and graduated in 1768 at age 20 with a doctorate of law. In 1772 he became a professor of law after conversion to Protestantism. The following year he married Afra Sausenhofer of Eichstätt.

After Pope Clement XIV's suppression of the Society of Jesus in 1773, Weishaupt became a professor of canon law, a position that was held exclusively by the Jesuits until that time. In 1775 Weishaupt was introduced to the empirical philosophy of Johann Georg Heinrich Feder of the University of Göttingen. Both Feder and Weishaupt would later become opponents of Kantian idealism.

== Foundation of the Illuminati ==
At a time, however, when there was no end of making game of and abusing secret societies, I planned to make use of this human foible for a real and worthy goal, for the benefit of people. I wished to do what the heads of the ecclesiastical and secular authorities ought to have done by virtue of their offices ...

On 1 May 1776 Johann Adam Weishaupt founded the "Illuminati" in the Electorate of Bavaria. Initially, the term Illumination referred to a select group of exceptional and enlightened individuals within society. The word derives from the Latin illuminatus, meaning 'enlightened'. He also adopted the name of "Brother Spartacus" within the order. Even encyclopedia references vary on the goal of the order, such as Catholic Encyclopedia (1910) saying the Order was not egalitarian or democratic internally, but sought to promote the doctrines of equality and freedom throughout society; while others such as Collier's have said the aim was to combat religion and foster rationalism in its place. The Illuminati was formed with the vision of liberating humans from religious bondage and undermining corrupted governments.

The actual character of the society was an elaborate network of spies and counter-spies. Each isolated cell of initiates reported to a superior, whom they did not know: a party structure that was effectively adopted by some later groups.

Weishaupt was initiated into the Masonic lodge "Theodor zum guten Rath", at Munich in 1777. His project of "illumination, enlightening the understanding by the sun of reason, which will dispel the clouds of superstition and of prejudice" was an unwelcome reform. He used Freemasonry to recruit for his own quasi-masonic society, with the goal of "perfecting human nature" through re-education to achieve a communal state with nature, freed of government and organized religion. Presenting their own system as pure masonry, Weishaupt and Adolph Freiherr Knigge, who organized his ritual structure, greatly expanded the secret organization.

Contrary to Immanuel Kant's famous dictum that Enlightenment (and Weishaupt's Order was in some respects an expression of the Enlightenment Movement) was the passage by a man out of his 'self-imposed immaturity' through daring to 'make use of his own reason, without the guidance of another,' Weishaupt's Order of Illuminati prescribed in great detail everything which the members had obediently to read and think so that Wolfgang Riedel has commented that this approach to illumination or enlightenment constituted a degradation and twisting of the Kantian principle of Enlightenment. Riedel writes:

The independence of thought and judgment required by Kant ... was specifically prevented by the Order of the Illuminati's rules and regulations. Enlightenment takes place here, if it takes place at all, precisely under the direction of another, namely under that of the "Superiors" [of the Order].

Weishaupt's radical rationalism and vocabulary were not likely to succeed. Writings that were intercepted in 1784 were interpreted as seditious, and the Society was banned by the government of Karl Theodor, Elector of Bavaria, in 1784. Weishaupt lost his position at the University of Ingolstadt and fled Bavaria.

== Activities in exile ==
He received the assistance of Duke Ernest II of Saxe-Gotha-Altenburg (1745–1804), and lived in Gotha writing a series of works on illuminism, including A Complete History of the Persecutions of the Illuminati in Bavaria (1785), A Picture of Illuminism (1786), An Apology for the Illuminati (1786), and An Improved System of Illuminism (1787). Adam Weishaupt died in Gotha on 18 November 1830. He was survived by his second wife, Anna Maria (née Sausenhofer), and his children Nanette, Charlotte, Ernst, Karl, Eduard, and Alfred. His body was buried next to that of his son Wilhelm, who preceded him in death (in 1802), at Friedhof II der Sophiengemeinde Berlin, a cemetery.

After Weishaupt's Order of Illuminati was banned and its members dispersed, it left behind no enduring traces of influence, not even on its own erstwhile members, who went on to develop in quite different directions.

== Assessment of character and intentions ==
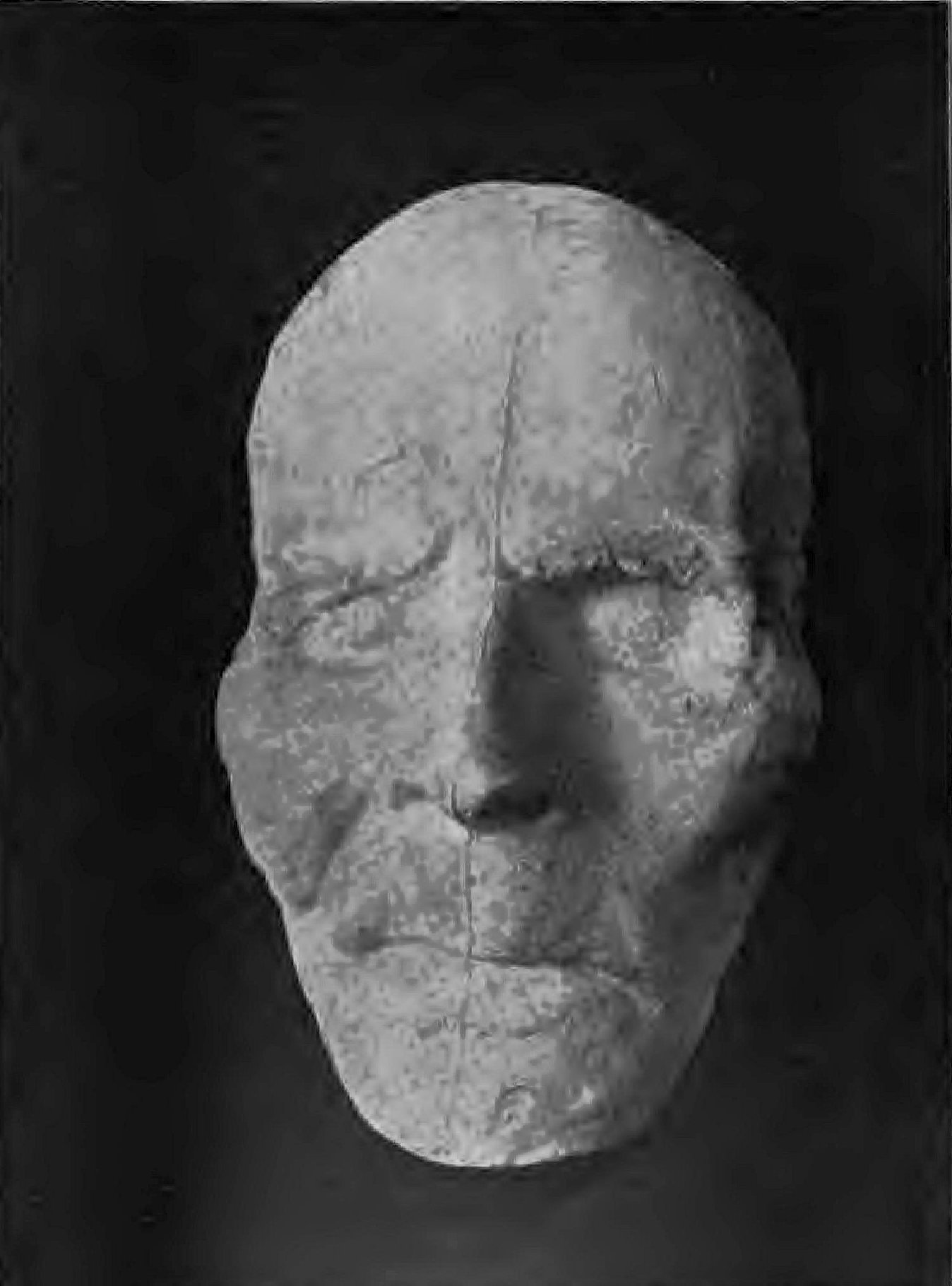
Death mask of Adam Weishaupt

Weishaupt's character and intentions have been variously assessed. Some took a negative view, such as Augustin Barruel, who despite writing that Weishaupt's goals were that "Equality and Liberty, together with the most absolute independence, are to be the substitutes for all rights and all property" saw this as more dangerous than beneficial, and John Robison, who regarded Weishaupt as a 'human devil' and saw his mission as one of malevolent destructiveness. Others took a more positive view, including Thomas Jefferson, who wrote in a letter to James Madison that "Barruel's own parts of the book are perfectly the ravings of a Bedlamite" and considered Weishaupt to be an "enthusiastic Philanthropist" who believed in the indefinite perfectibility of man, and believed that the intention of Jesus Christ was simply to "reinstate natural religion, and by diffusing the light of his morality, to teach us to govern ourselves".

In his defence, Weishaupt wrote a Kurze Rechtfertigung meiner Absichten (A Brief Justification of my Intentions) in 1787. Author Tony Page comments:

"Weishaupt's plan was to educate Illuminati followers in the highest levels of humanity and morality (basing his teachings on the supremacy of Reason, allied with the spirit of the Golden Rule of not doing to others what one would not wish done to oneself), so that if Illuminati alumni subsequently attained positions of significance and power (such as in the fields of education and politics), they could exert a benevolent and uplifting influence upon society at large. His project was utopian and naively optimistic, and he himself was certainly not without flaws of character – but neither he nor his plan was evil or violent in and of themselves. It is one of the deplorable and tragic ironies of history that a man who tried to inculcate virtue, philanthropy, social justice and morality has become one of the great hate-figures of 21st-century 'conspiracy' thinking."

== Works ==
=== Philosophical works ===
- (1775) De Lapsu Academiarum Commentatio Politica.
- (1786) Über die Schrecken des Todes – eine philosophische Rede.
  - (in French) Discours Philosophique sur les Frayeurs de la Mort (1788). Gallica
- (1786) Über Materialismus und Idealismus. Torino
- (1788) Geschichte der Vervollkommnung des menschlichen Geschlechts.
- (1788) Über die Gründe und Gewißheit der Menschlichen Erkenntniß.
- (1788) Über die Kantischen Anschauungen und Erscheinungen.
- (1788) Zweifel über die Kantischen Begriffe von Zeit und Raum.
- (1793) Über Wahrheit und sittliche Vollkommenheit.
- (1794) Über die Lehre von den Gründen und Ursachen aller Dinge.
- (1794) Über die Selbsterkenntnis, ihre Hindernisse und Vorteile.
- (1797) Über die Zwecke oder Finalursachen.
- (1802) Über die Hindernisse der baierischen Industrie und Bevölkerung.
- (1804) Die Leuchte des Diogenes.
- (1817) Über die Staats-Ausgaben und Auflagen. Google Books
- (1818) Über das Besteuerungs-System.

=== Works relating to the Illuminati ===
- (1786) Apologie der Illuminaten, ISBN 978-3-7448-1853-7.
- (1786) Vollständige Geschichte der Verfolgung der Illuminaten in Bayern.
- (1786) Schilderung der Illuminaten.
- (1787) Einleitung zu meiner Apologie.
- (1787) Einige Originalschriften des Illuminatenordens...
- (1787) Nachtrage von weitern Originalschriften...
- (1787) Kurze Rechtfertigung meiner Absichten.
- (1787) Nachtrag zur Rechtfertigung meiner Absichten.
- (1787) Apologie des Mißvergnügens und des Übels.
- (1787) Das Verbesserte System der Illuminaten.
- (1788) Der ächte Illuminat, oder die wahren, unverbesserten Rituale der Illuminaten.
- (1795) Pythagoras, oder Betrachtungen über die geheime Welt- und Regierungs-Kunst.

=== Works by Adam Weishaupt in English translation ===
- (2008) Diogenes' Lamp, or an Examination of Our Present Day Morality and Enlightenment, translated by Amelia Gill, The Masonic Book Club. Internet Archive
- (2015) The Secret School of Wisdom: The Authentic Rituals and Doctrines of the Illuminati, translated by Jeva Singh-Anand, edited by Josef Wäges and Reinhard Markner, London: Lewis Masonic, 447 pp., ISBN 978-0853184935
- (2014) A Brief Justification of My Intentions: Casting Light on the Latest Original Writings, translated by Tony Page, Justice Publications, Amazon Kindle.
- (2014) Supplement to the Justification of My Intentions, translated by Tony Page, Justice Publications, Amazon Kindle.
- (2025) Apology of the Illuminati, translated by Kane Kanerva, 192 pp.
