= Bavarian International School =

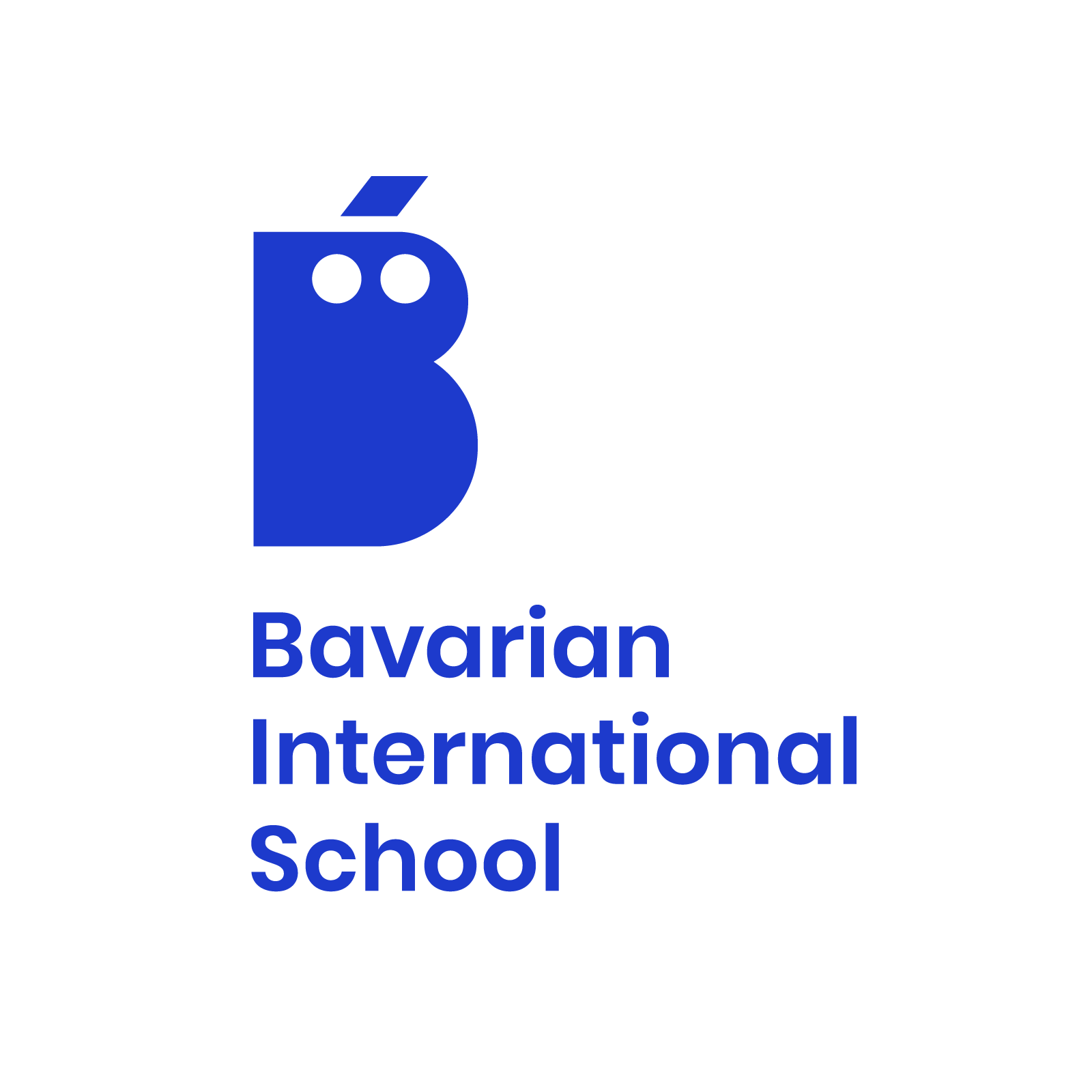
- BIS Campus Haimhausen: Hauptstraße 1, 85778 Haimhausen; BIS City Campus: Leopoldstraße 208, 80804 Munich; Bavaria; Germany

Information
- Type: International Baccalaureate-curriculum international school
- Motto: Believe, inspire, succeed
- Established: 1990; 36 years ago
- Director: John Barker
- Staff: 240 staff members (180 teachers from more than 40 nations)
- Grades: EC0-12
- Enrollment: 1,270 students (71 nationalities)
- Affiliation: International Baccalaureate Organisation; Council of International Schools; New England Association of Schools and Colleges
- Athletics: BIS Lions
- Website: www.bis-school.com

The Bavarian International School gAG (BIS) is an English-language International Baccalaureate-curriculum international school based in Haimhausen, a municipality in the district Dachau in Bavaria, Germany, just north of Munich. In 2016, a second campus in Munich-Schwabing (Leopoldstraße) was opened for primary students. The school currently has a combined enrolment of approximately 1200 students aged 3 to 18 from over 52 countries speaking more than 70 languages. The 2-campus-school is run by the non-profit association Bavarian International School gAG

BIS caters mainly to internationally mobile management who require an educational offer for their children from early childhood through secondary school which is internationally transferable. BIS does not claim to be an alternative to the German public school system. Nonetheless, approximately 20% of all BIS students are Munich locals.

== History and facilities ==
BIS was founded in 1990 as a non-profit association to serve the international community in the north of Munich. The school opened its doors in Schwabing on 19 February 1991 with just six students and grew steadily, with its first graduating class in 1997.

In 1998 the school moved to Schloss Haimhausen, a Rococo mansion located about ten kilometers north of Munich. Several purpose-built facilities, including a cafeteria, a performance arts center with 510 seats, a sports hall and 8-lane track were added to the school site over the following years. To make BIS-education more easily accessible for children living in the city, the BIS City Campus Primary School was opened for students in January 2016. In January 2017 about 200 children in EC1 (age 4) to Grade 5 were enrolled at the new campus, which has a capacity of 500 students.

== Curriculum and accreditation ==
BIS is an IB World School and takes part in the IB Diploma Programme. This program provides an internationally accepted qualification for entry into higher education and is recognised by many universities worldwide. The Bavarian International School is authorized to offer the IB Primary Years Programme (PYP), the IB Middle Years Programme (MYP), the IB Diploma Programme (DP) and the IB Career-related Programme (CP), all of the International Baccalaureate Organisation. The City Campus is authorized to offer the IB Primary Years Programme and accredited as an IB World School. City campus students get a guaranteed place at Haimhausen after year 5.

BIS is approved by the government of Bavaria and fully accredited by the Council of International Schools (CIS) and the New England Association of Schools and Colleges (NEASC). BIS is a member of the Educational Collaborative for International Schools (ECIS), the Association of German International Schools (AGIS), the Arbeitsgemeinschaft Internationale Schulen in Bayern (AISB), and the National Association for College Admission Counseling (NACAC).

== Co-curricular activities ==
=== Sports ===
BIS offers a wide variety of sports throughout the entire school year in 3 different seasons. There are competitive as well as recreational offerings. BIS students compete in the German International School Sports Tournaments (GISST) as well as the European Sports Conference (ESC).Today the program is called ASA (After school activities), these activities are directed by the sports department.

=== Arts ===
BIS regularly hosts or participates in the International Schools Theatre Association (ISTA) events. The school prominently promotes music and visual arts in their students as well.

=== Model United Nations ===
BIS also offers a Model United Nations club in which students can learn to debate and improve their public speaking skills. BIS has attended over 20 conferences internationally and locally in the last several years, in addition to hosting its own debating competition in 2014. In 2017 several Bavarian International School students attended the THIMUN conference in The Hague. They attended again in 2018 with great success, winning several awards. The BIS Model United Nations club is a student run activity which is the largest co-curricular activity the school offers, hosting up to 80 students.

== Faculty and staff ==
There are over 300 staff members working at BIS. The honorary Board of Directors is responsible for the management of the BIS Association. It carries out the resolutions of the General Meetings held in spring and fall of each year and bears the responsibility for the association's finances.

On September 10, 2014, BIS' staff held a warning strike at BIS to call for a collective bargaining agreement (CBA). A similar warning strike occurred on the November 30, 2015. Staff has since abandoned their pursuit of a CBA.

After 12 years as Head of School and Executive Board at BIS, American-German Dr. Chrissie Sorenson is passing the baton to British John Barker, who will take over the position starting in the 2026-27 school year.

== Notable alumni ==
- Dipangkorn Rasmijoti (current heir presumptive of the Kingdom of Thailand)
- Lilly Krug (model and actress)
- Nick Salihamidžić (FC Bayern Munich football player & son of Hasan Salihamidžić)

== Local ==
BIS actively participates and supports the local Haimhausen and district of Dachau communities, e.g. by cooperating with the local schools. Since 2004 the BIS and the SV Haimhausen have jointly organized the annual Haimhausen Triathlon.
