= Andreas Felix von Oefele =

German historian and librarian

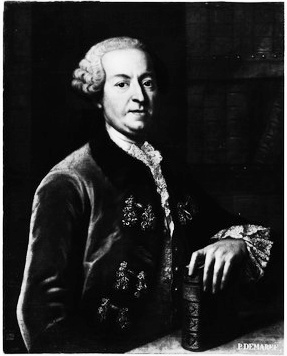
Andreas Felix von Oefele 1a

Andreas Felix von Oefele (17 May 1706 – 17 February 1780) was a German historian and librarian.

Von Oefele was born in Munich, in the Electorate of Bavaria, the son of an innkeeper. He attended the Jesuit secondary school "Wilhelmsgymnasium" and continued his studies of Law, history and theology at the universities of Ingolstadt and Leuven. In 1723, he began his 10 volume work "Lebensgeschichten der gelehrtesten Männer Bayerns" (Life stories of the most learned men of Bavaria). In 1727, he became librarian of the German national Library in Leuven, in 1734, he was appointed educator of the Bavarian Princes Clemens und Max, sons of Prince Ferdinand Maria.

When in 1746 the Bavarian Chancellor Franz Xaver Josef von Unertl had to give up control of the court library and the Secret Archives, Oefele was created head of the Court and State Library as "Electoral Councillor, Bibliothecarius and Antiquarius" by Elector Max III. Joseph. This office he relinquished only in 1778, when he had to retire for health reasons. In 1759, he was appointed member of the Bavarian Academy of Sciences. He died in Munich.

Andreas Felix von Oefele's papers are preserved in the Bayerische Staatsbibliothek.
