= Johann Adam von Ickstatt =

German educator and university director (1702–1776)

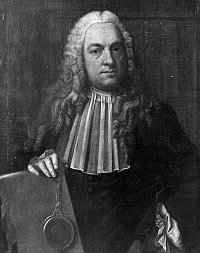
Johann Adam von Ickstatt

Johann Adam Freiherr von Ickstatt (6 January 1702 – 17 August 1776) was a German educator and director of the University of Ingolstadt. Born in Vockenhausen, he was a major proponent of the Enlightenment in Bavaria. He died in Waldsassen. He was a godfather to Adam Weishaupt.
