= Polling Abbey =

Abbey in Polling bei Weilheim, Germany

Coordinates: 47°48′42″N 11°07′54″E

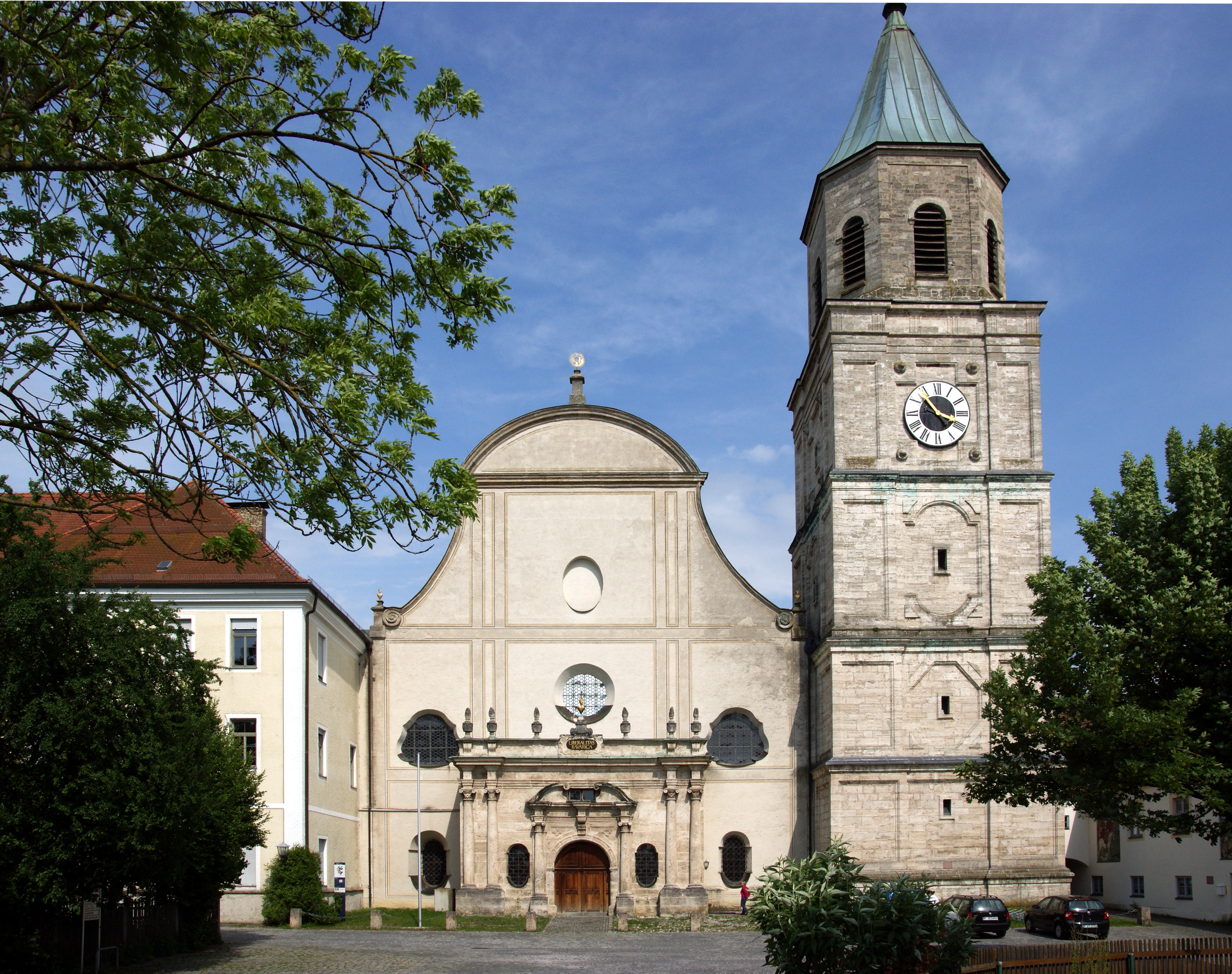
Polling Abbey

Polling Abbey (German: Kloster Polling) is a former monastery in Polling bei Weilheim, district of Weilheim-Schongau, in Upper Bavaria, Germany.

According to legend, the founder was Duke Tassilo III of Bavaria in about 750, but it seems more likely that the founders were members of the powerful Bavarian noble family of the Huosi.

Initially this was a Benedictine monastery, but later became a house of Augustinian canons. The pipe organs at the abbey were built in the 1620s by Simon Hayl. The abbey was dissolved during the secularization of 1803 and the buildings were mostly demolished between 1805 and 1807.

The important late Gothic abbey church with early Baroque stucco work by the Wessobrunn stuccoist Georg Schmuzer is now the parish church.

Part of what few buildings remained came into the possession of the Dominican sisters in 1892. The dispensary and the service block passed into private ownership.

The unique library of Polling Abbey was restored in 1970-1975 and may be visited by arrangement with the Verein der Freunde des Pollinger Bibliotheksaals e.V..

A hospice is also accommodated in the remaining premises on the former abbey site.
