= Sigmund von Haimhausen =

Bavarian aristocrat and mining operator

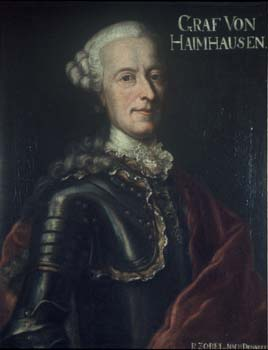
- Portrait of von Haimhausen (1708–1793)
- Born: Sigmund Ferdinand Graf von und zu Haimhausen; 28 December 1708; Munich, Bavaria
- Died: 16 January 1793 (aged 84); Munich, Bavaria
- Occupations: Lawyer, Statesman, Entrepreneur
- Known for: President of the Bavarian Academy of Science

Sigmund Graf von Haimhausen (28 December 1708 – 16 January 1793) was a Bavarian aristocrat, mining operator, head of the Bavarian Mint and Mines commission, porcelain manufacturer and first president of the Bavarian Academy of Sciences.

== Early years ==
Sigmund Ferdinand Graf von und zu Haimhausen was born on 28 December 1708 in Munich, in the Electorate of Bavaria. He came from a family ennobled by Charles V, Holy Roman Emperor (1500–1558). His father was Franz Joseph von und zu Haimhausen and his mother Maria Magdalena Baroness von Rehlin. Sigmund attended the Jesuit school in Munich, then in 1724 went with his older brother Charles Ferdinand to the University of Salzburg. After two years they moved on to study law in Prague. In the late summer of 1728 the two brothers began to travel, visiting Dresden, Berlin, Lübeck, Hamburg and Amsterdam. They spent a semester in Leyden where they and hundreds of young men heard Johann Jacob Vitriarius deliver his annual lectures on public law. They then visited London and spent eight months in Paris before returning home in July 1730.

== Mining ==
Their grandfather died on 11 January 1724 and left Sigmund his Bavarian and Bohemian properties, leaving only the title and a legacy to Charles. However, the government overrode the will and decreed that Charles should receive the possessions in Bavaria and Sigmund those in Bohemia. Sigmund's Bohemian properties included the Gute Kuttenplan copper mine and other mines. Haimhausen devoted himself to the study of mining. He attended the metallurgical lectures of Dr. Störr in Leipzig, traveled through the Saxon ore fields and Austrian mining towns, and talked or corresponded with leading experts in mining.

When Charles VI, Holy Roman Emperor, died on 20 October 1740 Sigmund joined in the homage of Bohemia in Prague and attended the coronation of Charles VII, Holy Roman Emperor, in Frankfurt. He moved temporarily to Bavaria, and this move became permanent under Maximilian III Joseph, Elector of Bavaria. In 1751 the Elector Max III Joseph appointed Haimhausen Master of the Mint and Director of Mines in Bavaria. He was appointed to the privy council the same year.

== Porcelain ==
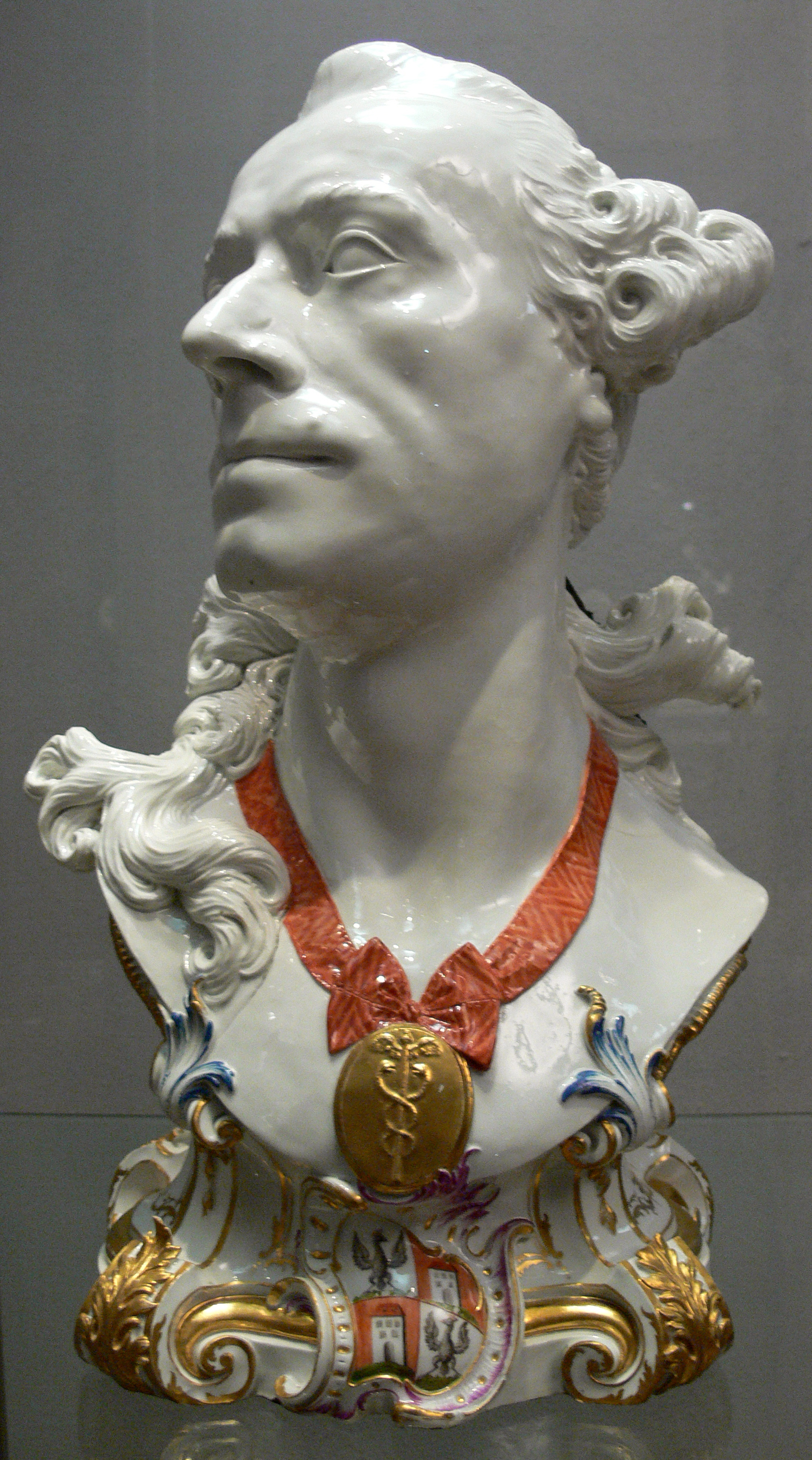
Bust by Franz Anton Bustelli of Sigmund von Haimhausen (1761) from the Nymphenburg Porcelain Manufactory

Starting in 1747, with the support of the Elector Max III Joseph, there were unsuccessful attempts to produce high-quality porcelain in the Neudeck hunting lodge in Miunich's suburb of Au. The Elector gave up funding the venture, but Haimhausen took over management and invested about 10,000 Bavarian Gulden in the enterprise from 1751-55. In 1753 he employed the skilled manufacturer Joseph Jakob Ringler, and the first porcelain was produced in 1754. On 30 May 1754 the factory was incorporated into the Bavarian state system, and made a department of the Mint and Mining Commission headed by Haimhausen.

In 1754 the factory hired Franz Anton Bustelli from Ticino in Switzerland as head of the modelling shop. He became model master, and contributed greatly to the early success of the factory. In 1761 the "Churfürstliche Porcelain-Fabrique" (Electoral Porcelain Factory) was transferred to the Nymphenburg Palace in Munich. After some difficulties, the Nymphenburg Porcelain Manufactory became successful and delivered high-quality products.

The factory was best known for its Rococo figures, including Bustelli's Chinese and Turkish figures, and his models of sixteen characters from the commedia dell'arte. Bustelli's successor Dominik Auliczek (1734-1804) was known for groups of fighting animals, such as one of a bear being attacked by hounds. The factory did not make much tableware, but the "Haimhausen" and "Electoral Court" services are excellent, richly decorated in floral sprays, butterflies and other insects. The elector awarded Haimhausen a medal for his achievements.

== Academy of Sciences ==
Haimhausen's main achievement was his successful participation in founding the Munich Academy of Sciences. Johann Georg Dominicus von Linprun and his friend Georg von Lori developed the idea of instituting a learned society in the Bavarian capital that would disseminate useful knowledge about history, philosophy and mathematics in verbal and written form. They discussed the plans with Haimhausen and enlisted his support. With his influential contacts, he won over the Privy Chancellor Wiguläus von Kreittmayr, the President of the Chamber Grafen von Törring and others, and took the plan to Maximilian Joseph III. Despite objections from the Jesuits, on 28 March 1759 the Elector signed the foundation charter of the Academy. Haimhausen was elected president on 21 November 1759 at the first meeting of the Academy.

In 1770 his elder brother Charles died without male issue, and Sigmund inherited the Bavarian possessions. After the death of his wife, a Baroness von Wolframsdorf, Sigmund paid a long visit to Italy in 1770-72. He died on 16 January 1793 in Munich aged 84. He was survived by two daughters. The Bavarian Haimhauser estates passed to his sister, Maria Anna Susanna, who had married Count Wenzel Butler von Clonebough against her father's wishes. The Bohemian estates were divided between his daughters.

== Gallery ==
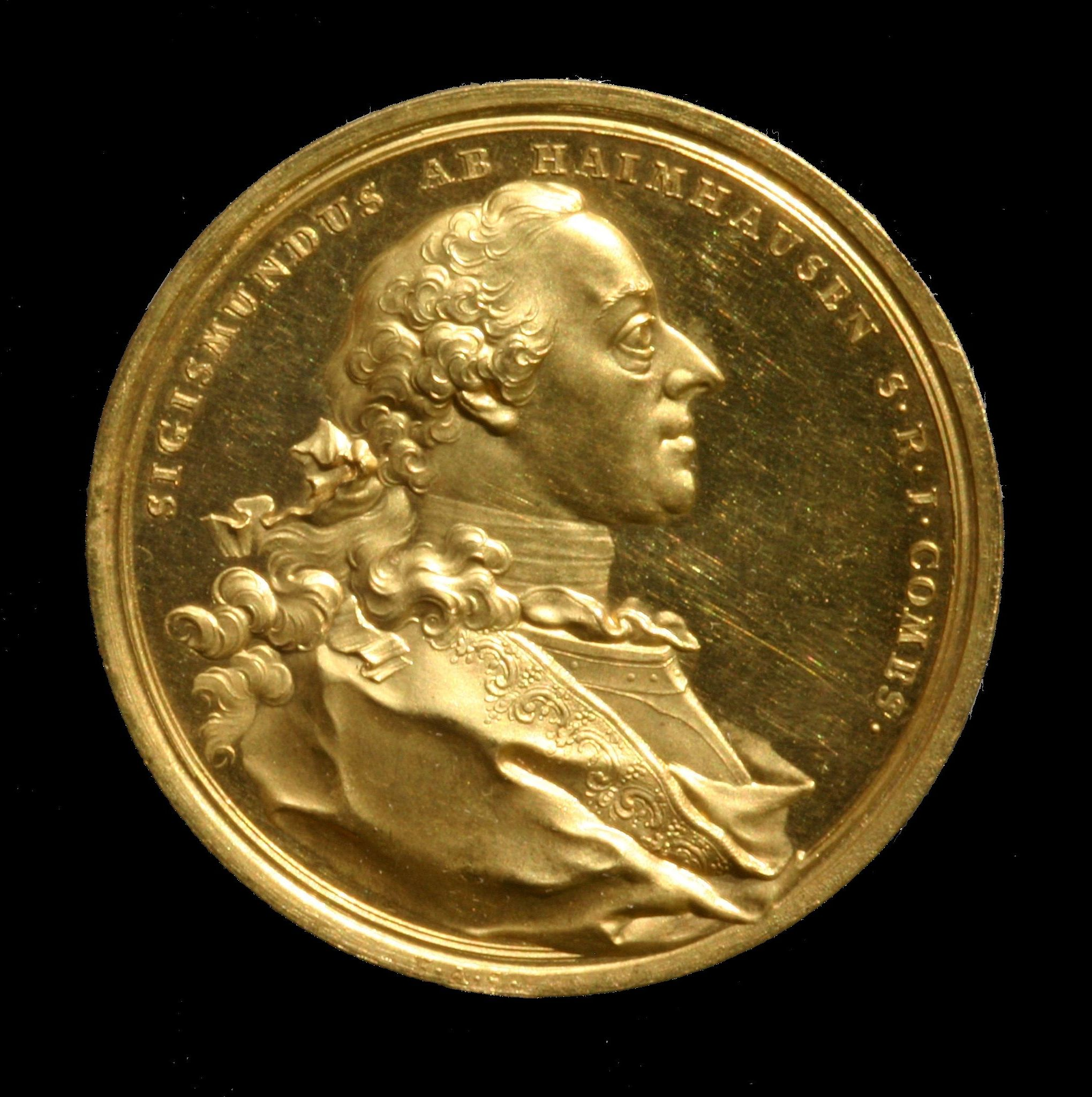
Sigmund of Haimhausen medal by Franz Schega, 1760

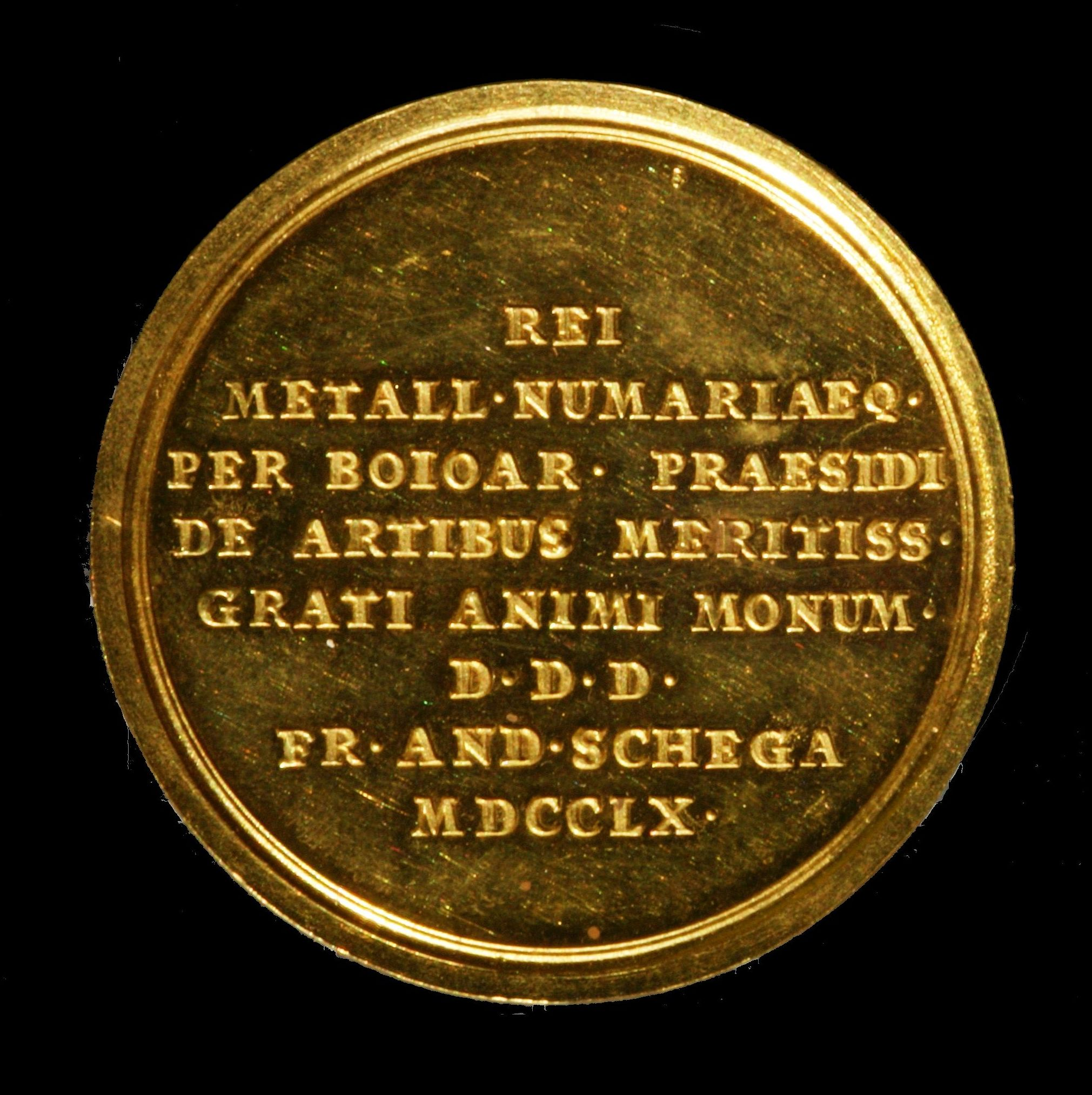
Sigmund of Haimhausen medal by Franz Schega, 1760, obverse

== Sources ==
- "Berchem-Haimhausen". Heimatkreis Plan-Weseritz.
- Campbell, Gordon (2006). The Grove Encyclopedia of Decorative Arts. Oxford University Press. ISBN 978-0-19-518948-3.
- Eisenhart, Johann August Ritter von (1879). "Haimhausen, Sigmund Ferdinand Graf von und zu". Allgemeine Deutsche Biographie. Vol. 10. Historischen Kommission bei der Bayerischen Akademie der Wissenschaften. p. 388.
- "Sigmund Graf von Haimhausen, Gründungspräsident der Kurbayerischen Akademie". Bayerische Nationalmuseum.
- "Sigmund Reichsgraf von Haimhausen". Nymphenburg Art and Design.
