= Bavarian Academy of Sciences and Humanities =

Independent public institution in Germany

Coordinates: 48°08′30″N 11°34′50″E

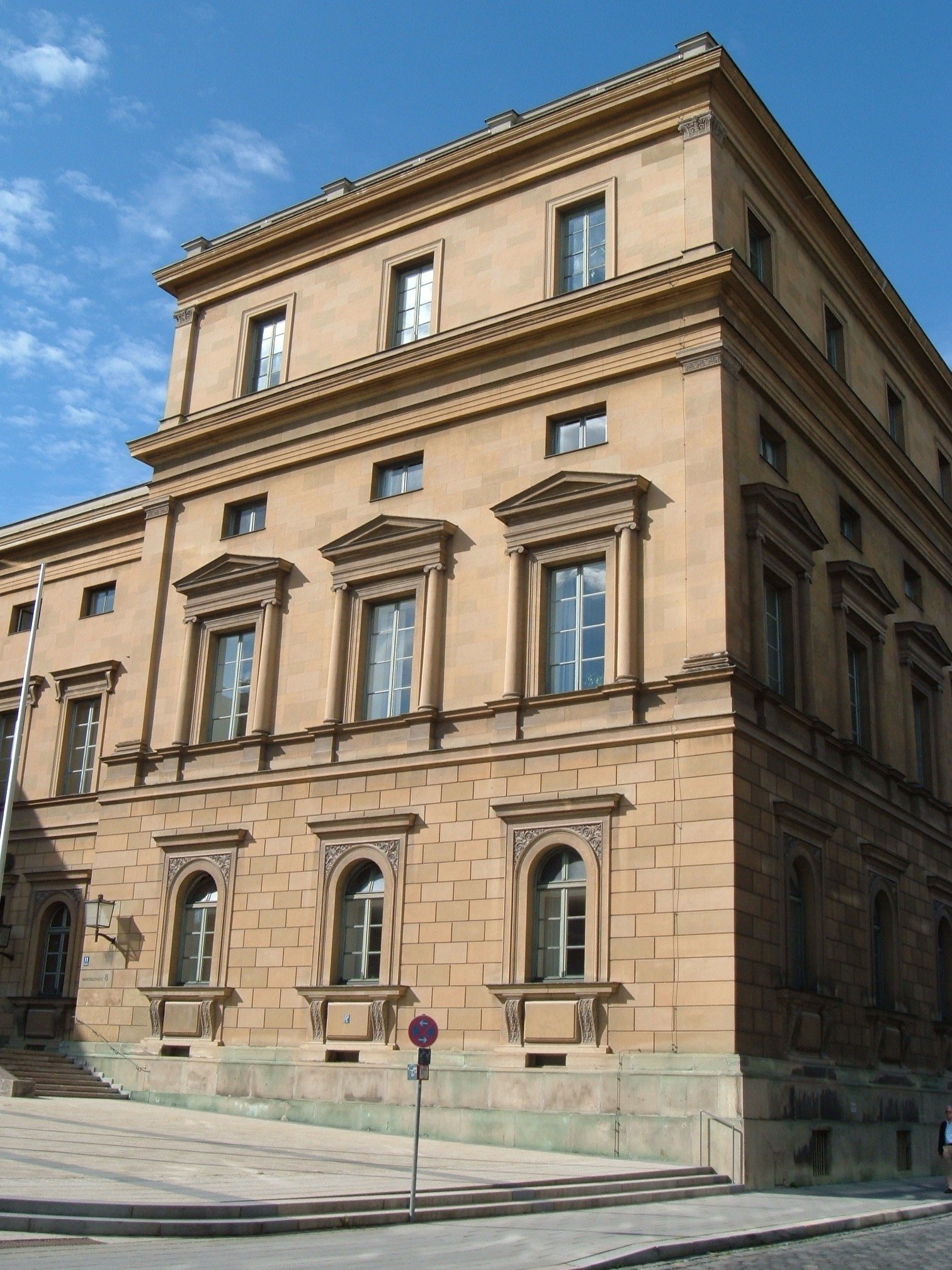
Bayerische Akademie der Wissenschaften, Munich

The Bavarian Academy of Sciences and Humanities (German: Bayerische Akademie der Wissenschaften) is an independent public institution, located in Munich. It appoints scholars whose research has contributed considerably to the increase of knowledge within their subject. The general goal of the academy is the promotion of interdisciplinary encounters and contacts and the cooperation of representatives of different subjects.

== History ==
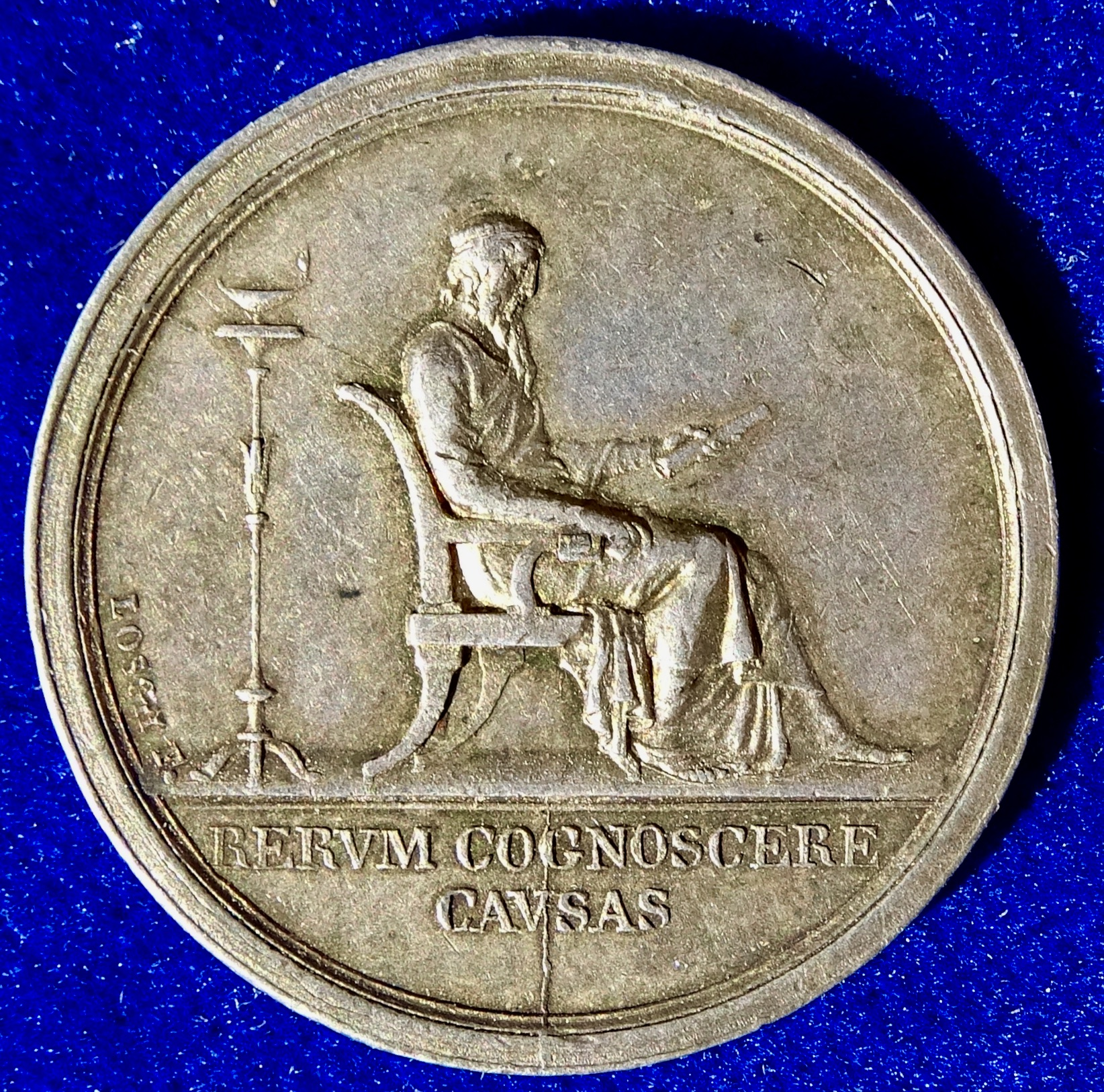
German State Kingdom of Bavaria Silver Prize Token 1807, obverse

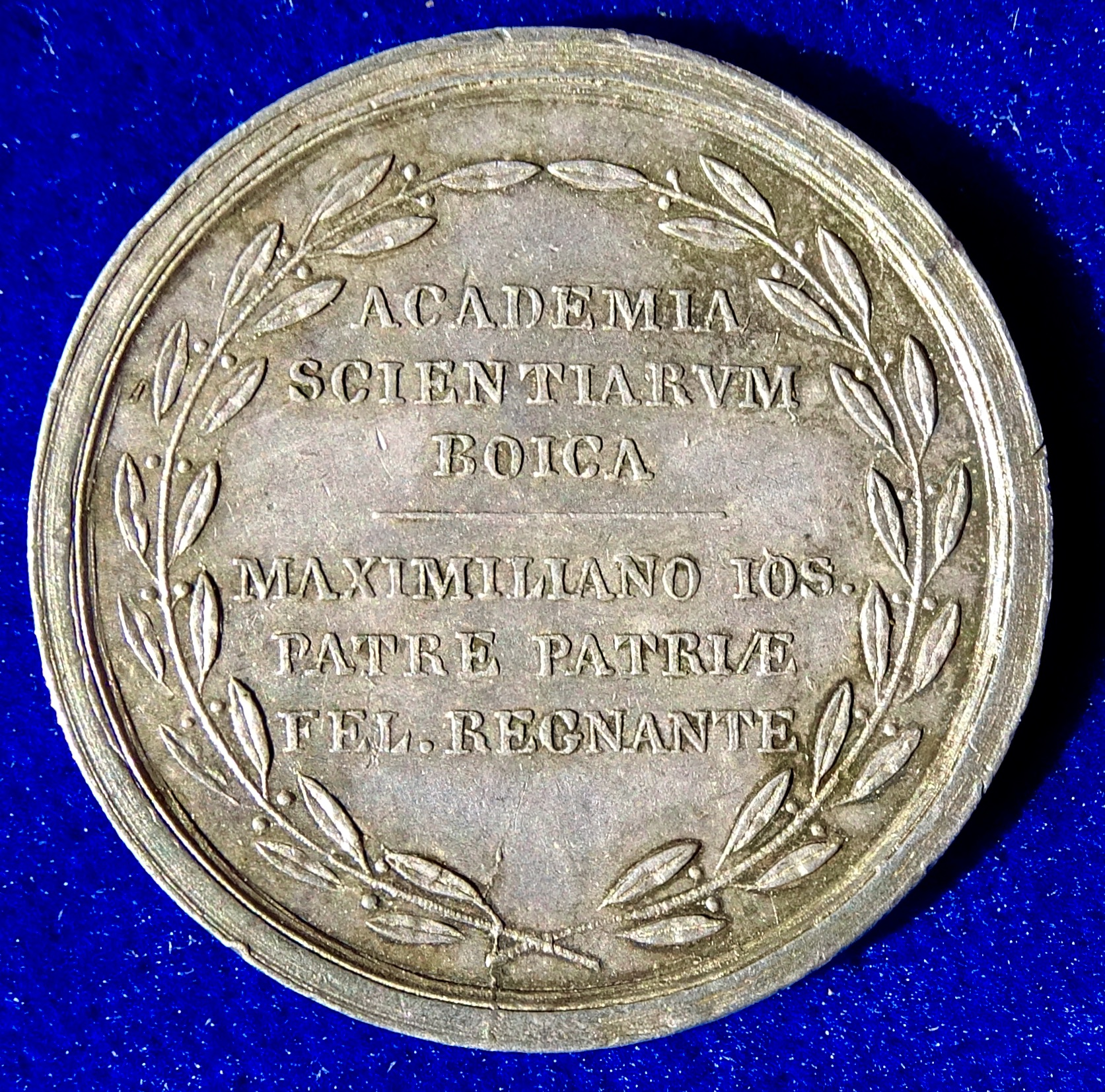
The reverse of this medal

On 12 October 1758 the lawyer Johann Georg von Lori (1723–1787), Privy Counsellor at the College of Coinage and Mining in Munich, founded the Bayerische Gelehrte Gesellschaft (Learned Society of Bavaria). This led to the foundation by Maximilian III Joseph, Elector of Bavaria, of the Bavarian Academy of Sciences and Humanities on 28 March 1759. Count Sigmund von Haimhausen was the first president. The Academy's foundation charter specifically mentions the Parnassus Boicus, an earlier learned society.

Originally, the Academy consisted of two divisions, the Class for History (Historische Klasse) and the Class for Philosophy (Philosophische Klasse); natural sciences, including mathematics and physics, were thought of as part of the Class for Philosophy. Today, the Academy is still divided into two classes, but the classes are now the Class for Philosophy and History (which also includes the humanities and social sciences) and the Class for Mathematics and the Natural Sciences.

== Members ==
In each class, the number of ordinary members is limited to 45, and the number of corresponding members is limited to 80. However, ordinary members at or over the age of 70 are not counted towards this limit; the number of ordinary members is, therefore, usually around 120.

During the course of its history, the academy has had numerous famous members including Johann Wolfgang von Goethe, the Grimm brothers, Theodor Mommsen, Anthimos Gazis, Alexander and Wilhelm von Humboldt, Kurt Sethe, Max Planck, Otto Hahn, Albert Einstein, Max Weber, Werner Heisenberg and Adolf Butenandt.

The first women were admitted as full members of the academy in 1995, and including the geneticist Regine Kafmann and the Indo-European linguist Johanna Narten.

== Presidents ==
First president was the chairman of the Mint and Mining Commission, Sigmund, Count of Haimhausen. Further presidents included Friedrich Heinrich Jacobi, Anton Clemens von Toerring-Seefeld, Friedrich Wilhelm von Schelling, Justus von Liebig, Ignaz von Döllinger, Max von Pettenkofer and Walther Meißner.

At present, the presidency is held by Markus Schwaiger.

== Commissions of the Academy ==
For the pursuit of long-term projects, the Academy forms Commissions. At present, 37 Commissions employ more than 450 persons.

== See also ==
- LMU Munich
- Technical University of Munich
- List of universities in Germany
- Bavaria
- German Academy of Sciences Leopoldina
