= 5196 Bustelli =

Main-belt asteroid

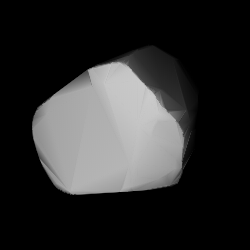
- Shape model of Bustelli from its lightcurve

Discovery
- Discovered by: C. J. van Houten; I. van Houten-G. T. Gehrels
- Discovery site: Palomar Obs.
- Discovery date: 30 September 1973

Designations
- Named after: Franz Anton Bustelli (Italian-Swiss artist)
- Alternative designations: 3102 T-2 · 1982 SY_{9} 1984 DP_{1} · 1984 FP_{1}
- Minor planet category: main-belt · (middle); Eunomia

Orbital characteristics
- Epoch 23 March 2018 (JD 2458200.5)
- Uncertainty parameter 0
- Observation arc: 46.60 yr (17,019 d)
- Aphelion: 3.0788 AU
- Perihelion: 2.3183 AU
- Semi-major axis: 2.6985 AU
- Eccentricity: 0.1409
- Orbital period (sidereal): 4.43 yr (1,619 d)
- Mean anomaly: 268.18°
- Mean motion: 0° 13^{m} 20.28^{s} / day
- Inclination: 13.226°
- Longitude of ascending node: 6.8289°
- Argument of perihelion: 113.42°

Physical characteristics
- Mean diameter: 5.944±0.091 km
- Geometric albedo: 0.146±0.017
- Spectral type: SMASS = S
- Absolute magnitude (H): 12.8

5196 Bustelli (prov. designation: 3102 T-2) is a stony Eunomia asteroid from the central regions of the asteroid belt, approximately 6 kilometers (3.7 miles) kilometers in diameter. It was discovered on 30 September 1973, by Dutch astronomers Ingrid and Cornelis van Houten at Leiden, and Tom Gehrels the Palomar Observatory. The S-type asteroid was named after Italian-Swiss artist Franz Anton Bustelli.

== Orbit and classification ==
Bustelli is a core member of the Eunomia family (502), a prominent family of stony S-type asteroid and the largest one in the intermediate main belt with more than 5,000 members. It orbits the Sun in the central asteroid belt at a distance of 2.3–3.1 AU once every 4 years and 5 months (1,619 days; semi-major axis of 2.7 AU). Its orbit has an eccentricity of 0.14 and an inclination of 13° with respect to the ecliptic. The body's observation arc begins with a precovery taken at Palomar Observatory in March 1971.

== Palomar–Leiden Trojan survey ==
The survey designation "T-2" stands for the second Palomar–Leiden Trojan survey, named after the fruitful collaboration of the Palomar and Leiden Observatory in the 1960s and 1970s. Gehrels used Palomar's Samuel Oschin telescope (also known as the 48-inch Schmidt Telescope), and shipped the photographic plates to Ingrid and Cornelis van Houten at Leiden Observatory where astrometry was carried out. The trio is credited with the discovery of several thousand asteroid discoveries.

== Naming ==
This minor planet was named after Italian-Swiss artist Franz Anton Bustelli (1723–1763), a famous modeller of figures for the Nymphenburg Porcelain Manufactory. The official naming citation was published by the Minor Planet Center on 1 September 1993 (M.P.C. 22507).

== Physical characteristics ==
Bustelli has an absolute magnitude of 12.8. In the SMASS classification, it is a stony S-type asteroid.

=== Diameter and albedo ===
According to the survey carried out by the NEOWISE mission of NASA's Wide-field Infrared Survey Explorer, Bustelli measures 5.944 kilometers in diameter and its surface has an albedo of 0.146.

=== Rotation period ===
As of 2018, no rotational lightcurve of Bustelli has been obtained from photometric observations. The body's rotation period, poles and shape remain unknown.
