= Dominik Auliczek =

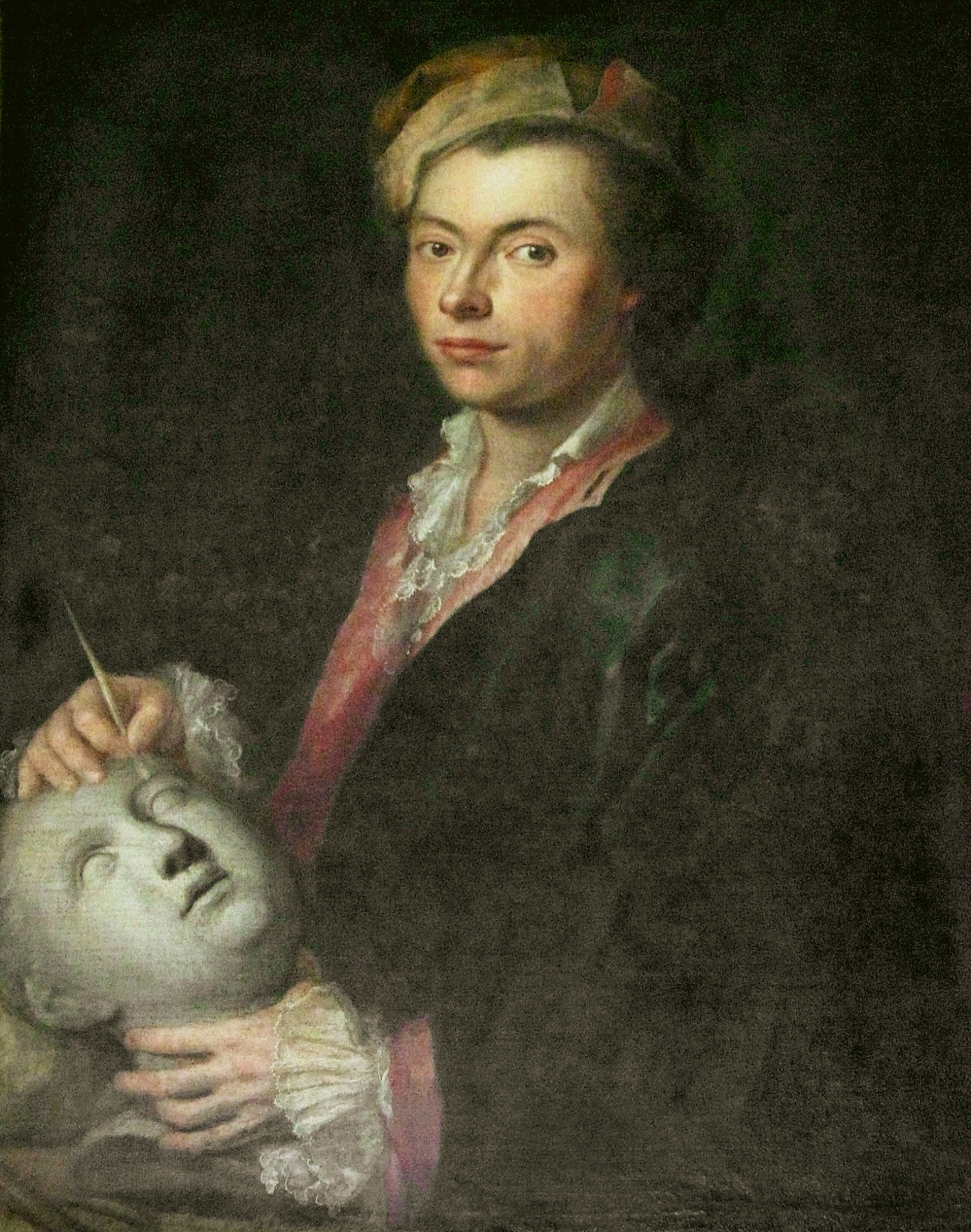
- Oil painting of Dominikus Auliczek by Joseph Weiß
- Born: 1 August 1734; Polička, Bohemia
- Died: 15 April 1804 (aged 69); Munich, Bavaria
- Occupation: Sculptor
- Known for: Nymphenburg porcelain

Dominik Auliczek (or Dominikus, Dominic, Aulizek; 1 August 1734 – 15 April 1804) was a sculptor and porcelain designer born in Bohemia who was employed for many years by the porcelain factory at the Nymphenburg Palace, Munich, Bavaria.

== Life ==
Dominik Auliczek was born in Polička, Bohemia on 1 August 1734. His father was Mathias Auliczek, the mayor of the town, and his mother was Rosina Martini.

Auliczek studied with F. Pacak in Litomyšl. He then studied in Vienna in 1752–53, first with J. G. Leutner and then at the academy. In 1754 he was in Paris, and in 1755–56 he studied at the academy in London. In 1756–59 he studied at the academy in Rome. In 1759 he earned a prize for sculpture from the Accademia di San Luca, and was awarded the Order of the Golden Spur by Pope Clement XIII. The award conferred nobility. He then worked for three years under Gaetano Chiaveri.

Auliczek had completed several statues, and was preparing to return to Bohemia with his earnings when he was robbed by a confidence man posing as a bishop. Auliczek moved to Munich in 1762, and joined the Nymphenburg Porcelain Manufactory in 1763, first as a repairer and then as a master modeler. On 28 November 1765 he married Maria Josepha, daughter of the artist Joseph Weiß, in Nymphenburg. They had three daughters and five sons. In 1772 he was appointed court sculptor. He became a councilor in 1782. He retired in 1797.

Dominik Auliczek died in Munich on 15 April 1804, aged 69. His son Dominikus von Auliczek the Younger (born 17 November 1775) was also a porcelain designer and from 1829 to 1835 was the owner of a porcelain factory in Regensburg.

== Work ==
Auliczek's work was at first strongly influenced by the Romanesque and then Late Baroque, at the end by Rococo, and was starting to show signs of Classicism. Nothing of the Roman period can be seen in his large sculptures. He created figures of gods for the Electoral palace gardens in Nymphenburg in 1770–82, and three groups of cherubs in 1776. The statues included Jupiter, Juno, Pluto and Proserpina. His depictions of fighting animals are the most notable of his porcelain figures and groups, and he also made well-executed figures of gods and portraits in relief. The Perlservice is the best example of his tableware.

== Gallery ==
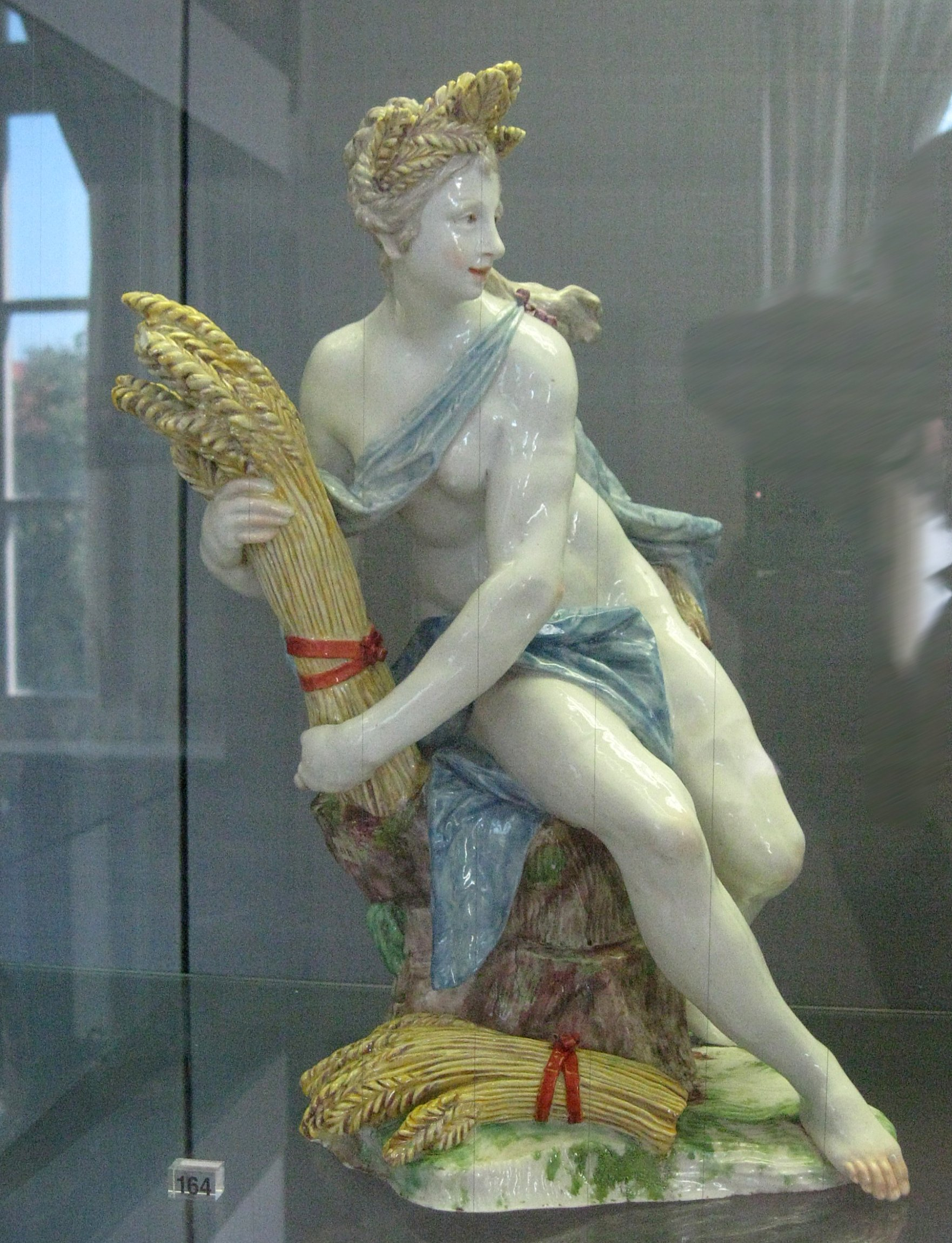
Ceres

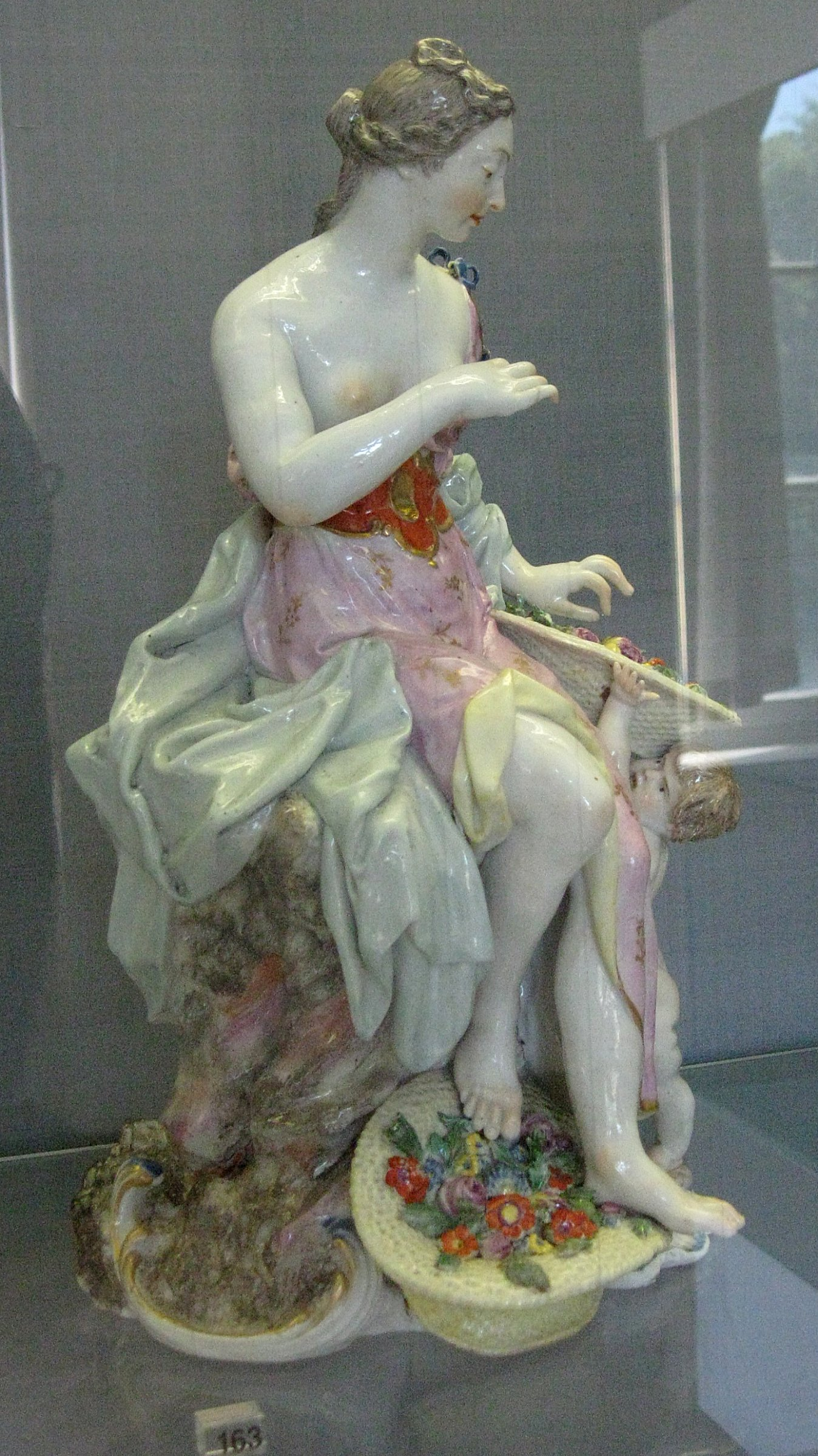
Flora

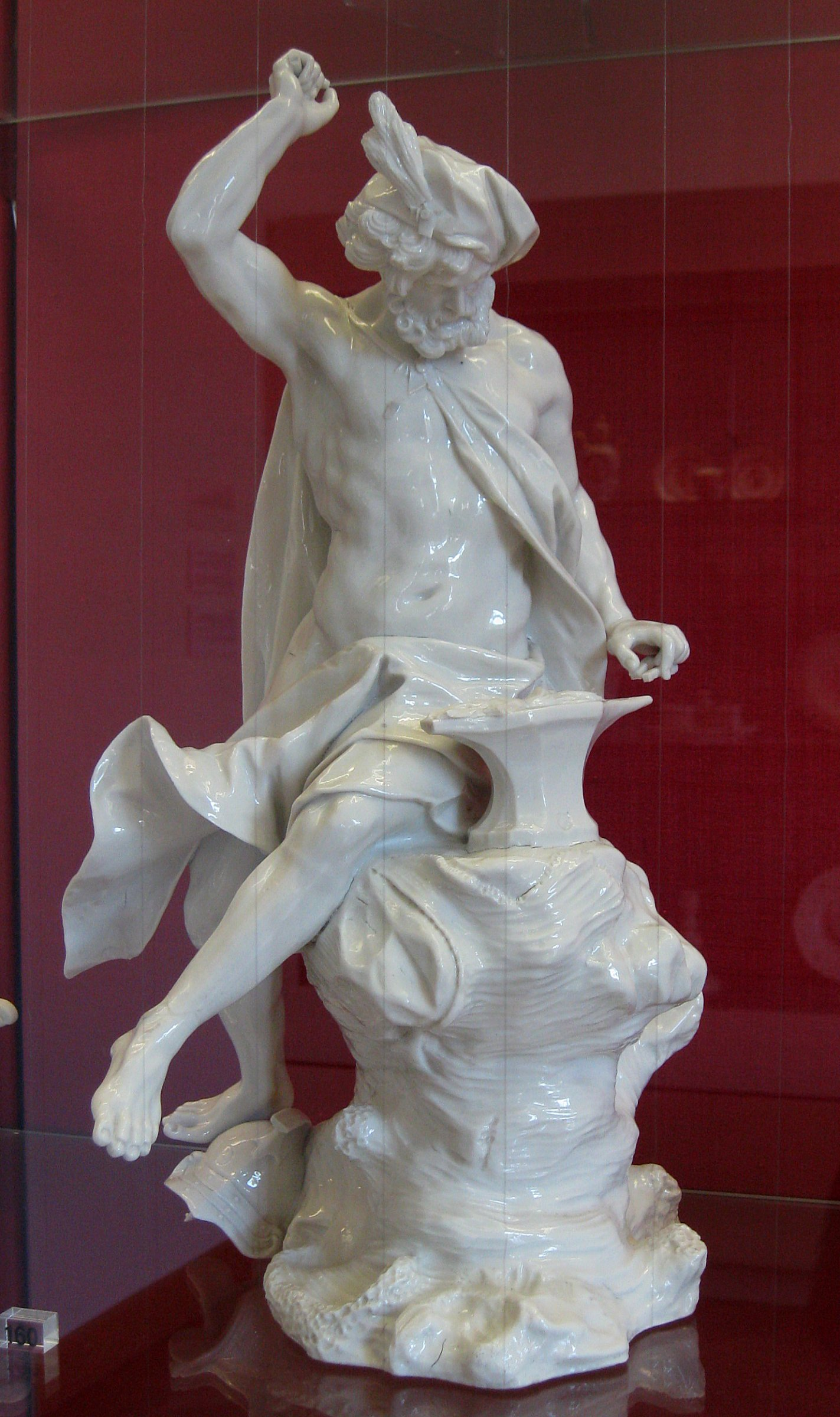
Mythical God

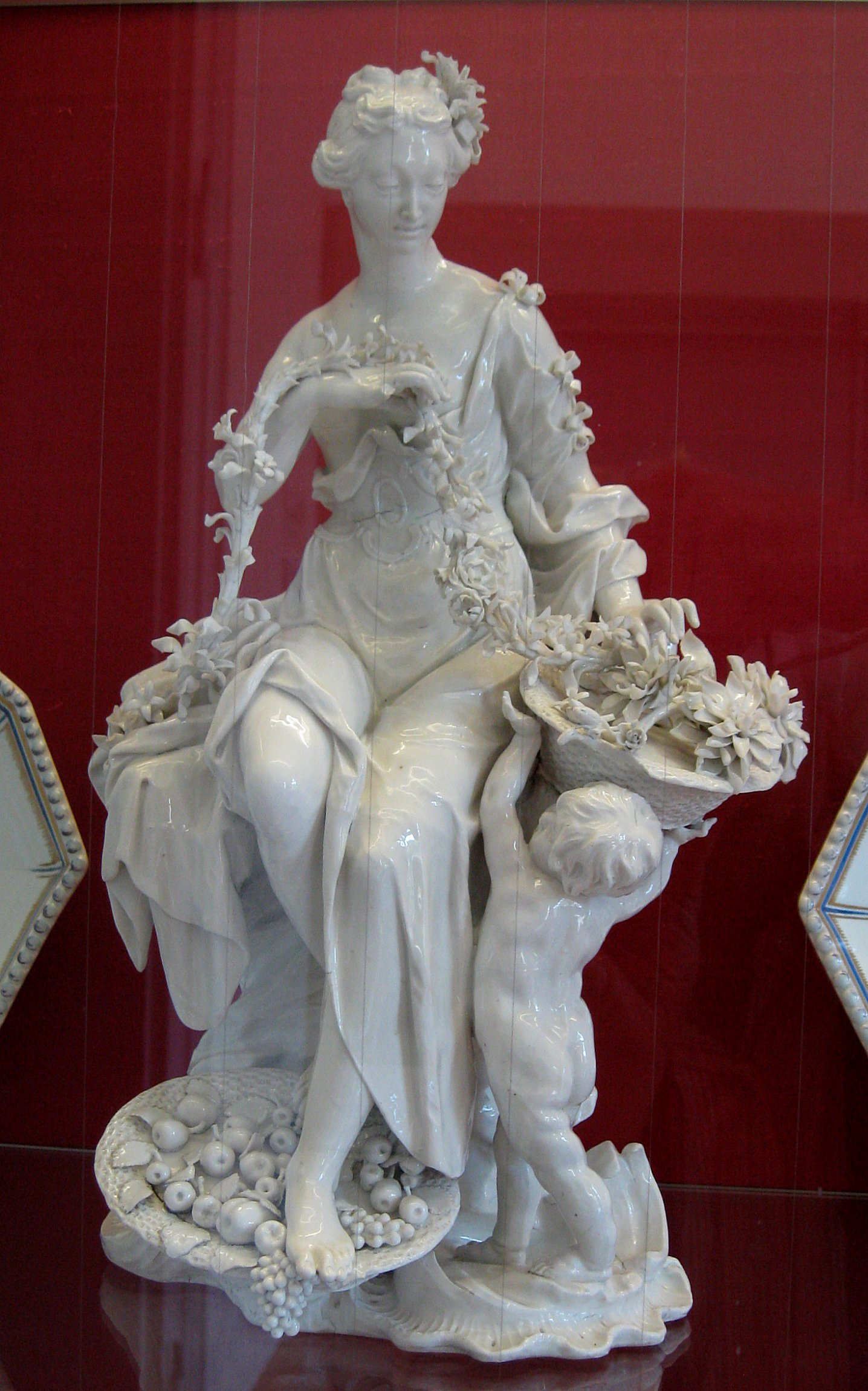
Mythical Goddess

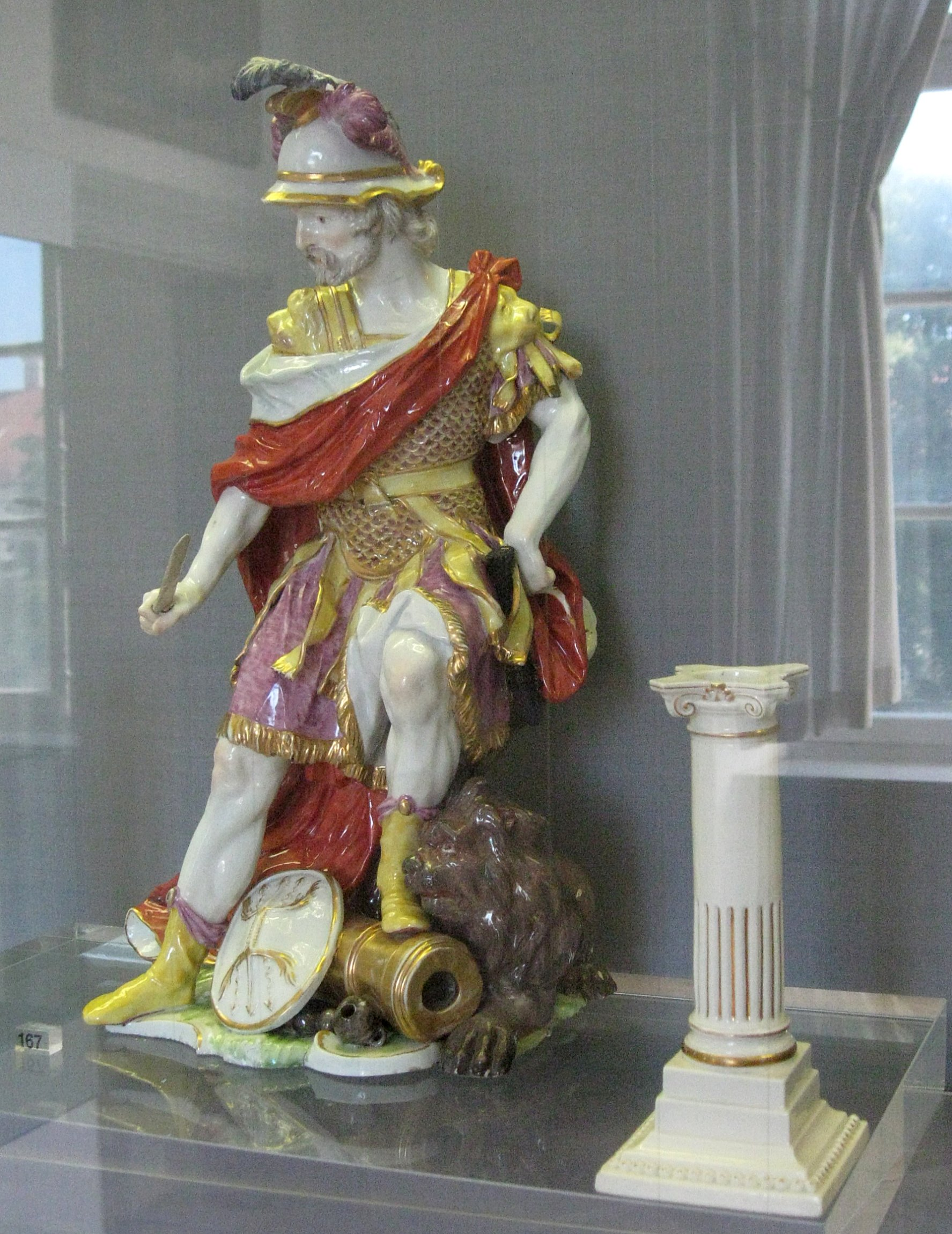
Mythical God

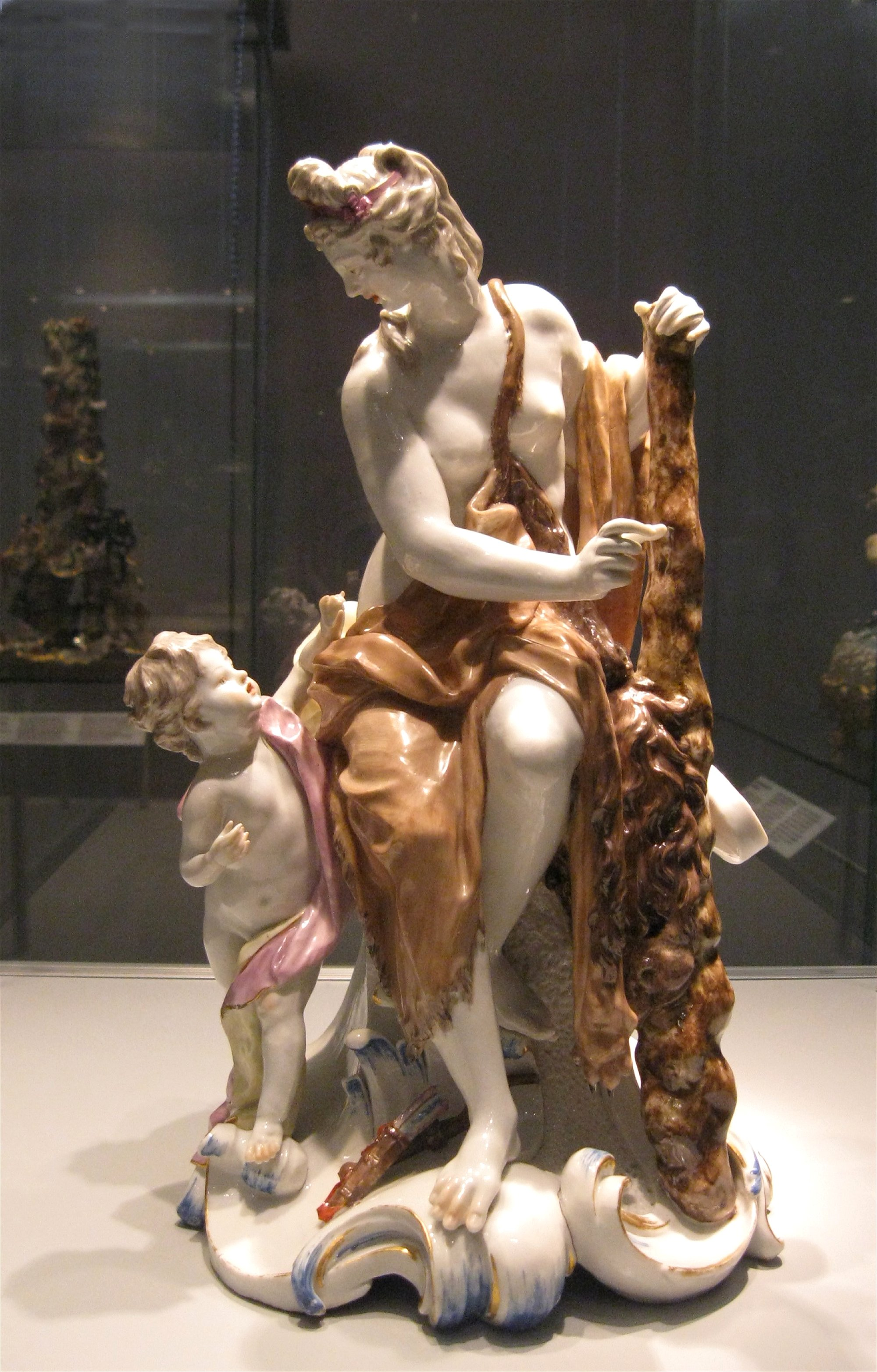
Omphale

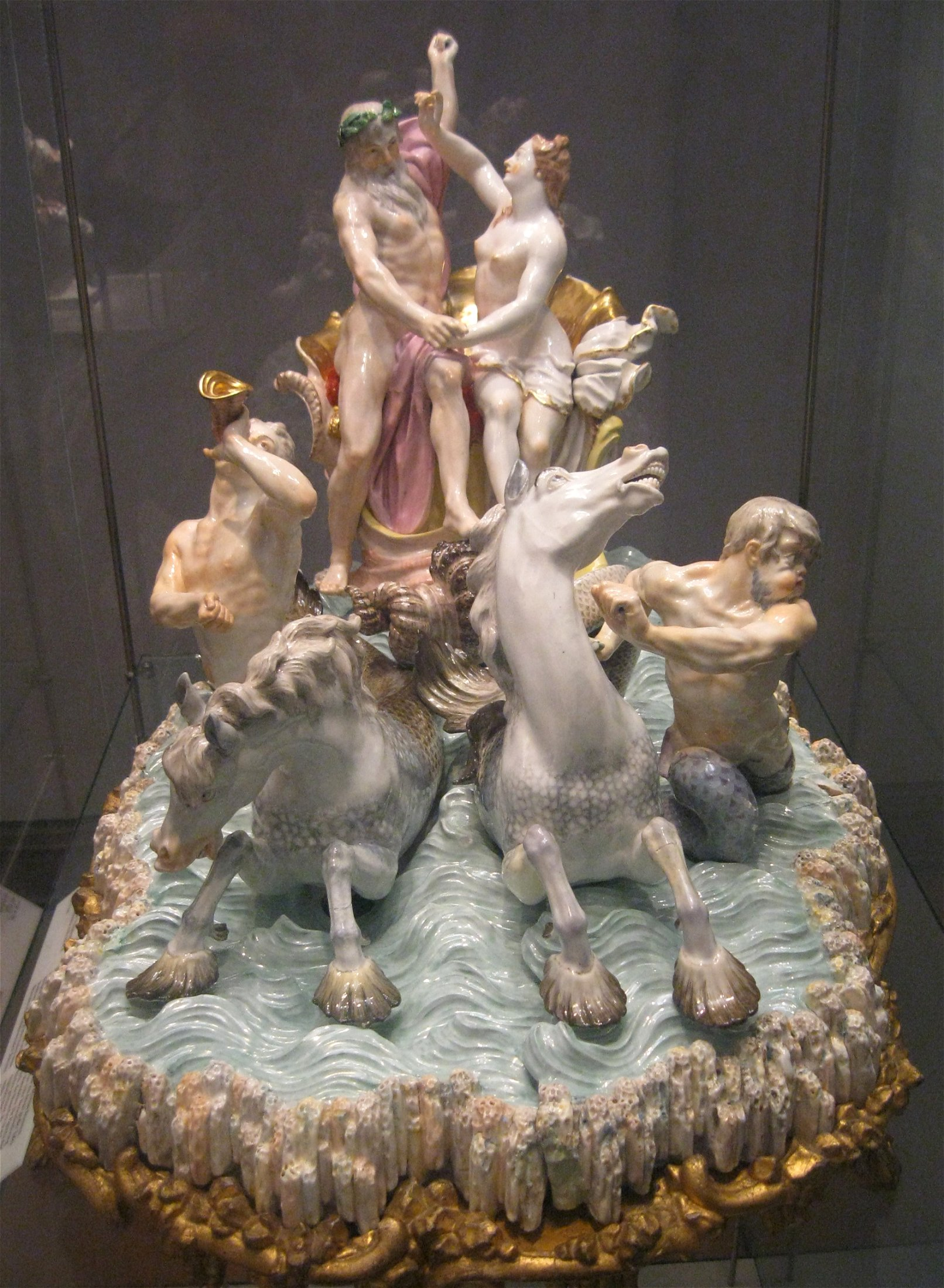
Neptune and Amphitrite in the shell chariot

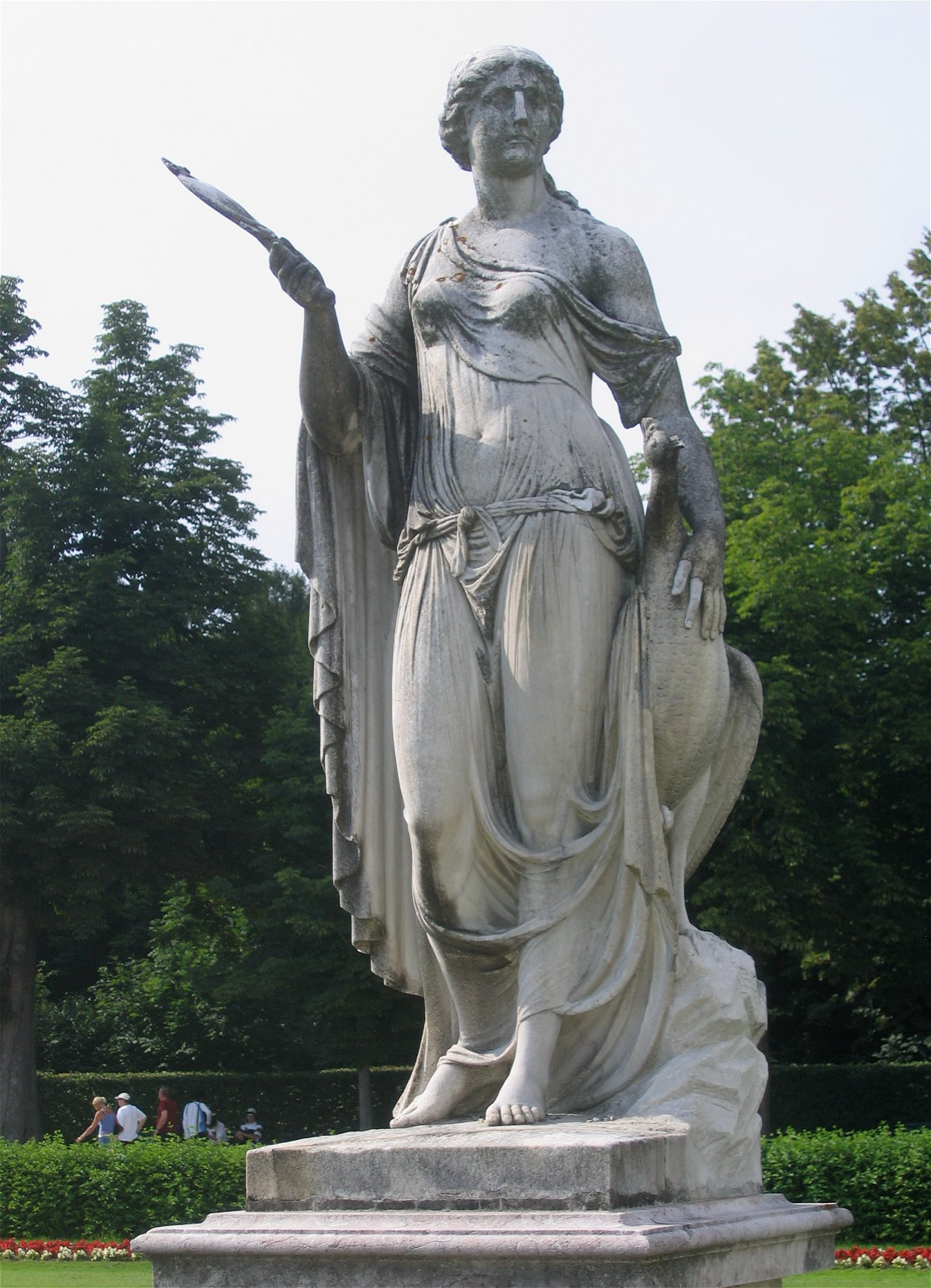
Nymphenburg statue: Juno

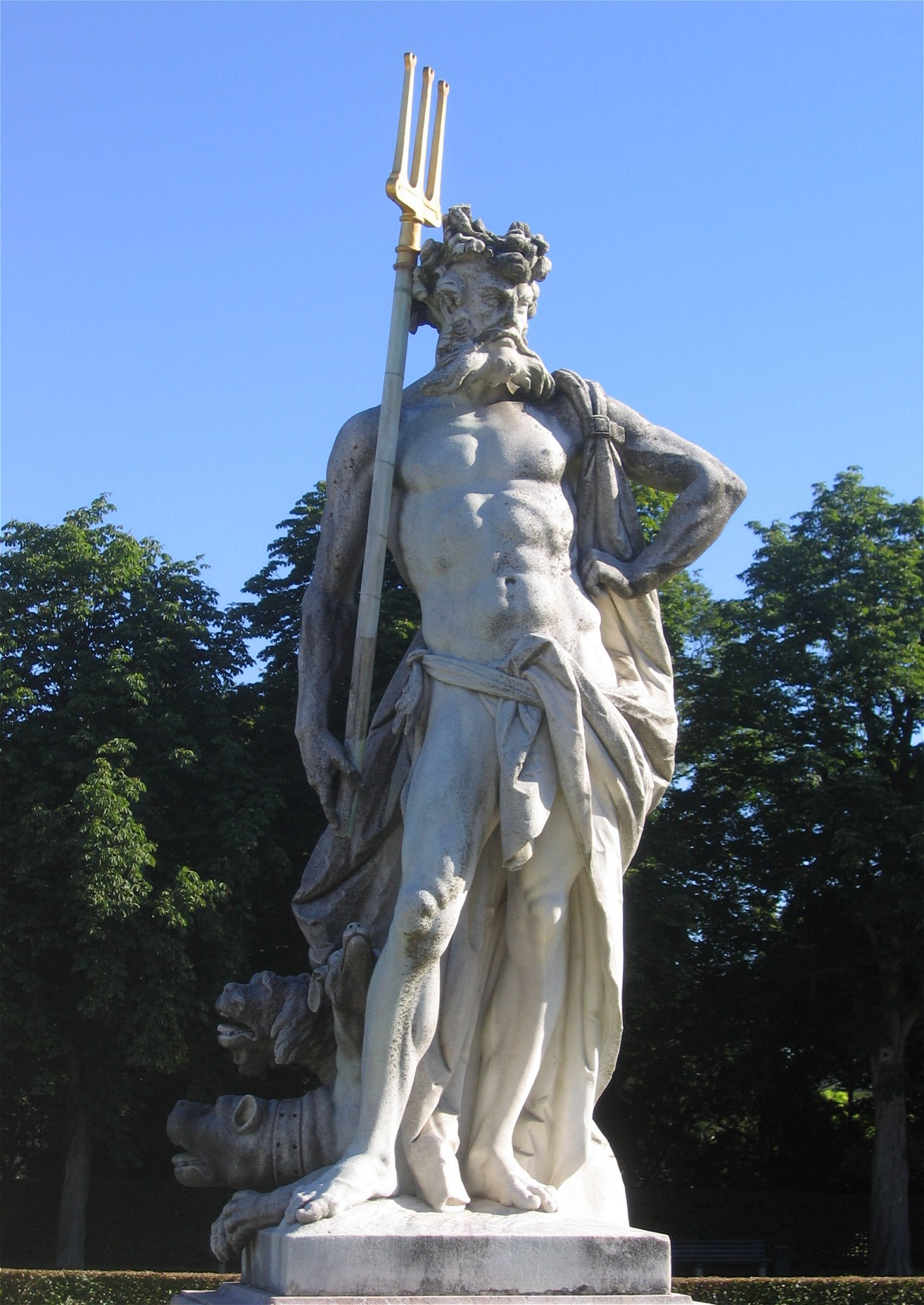
Nymphenburg statue: Pluto

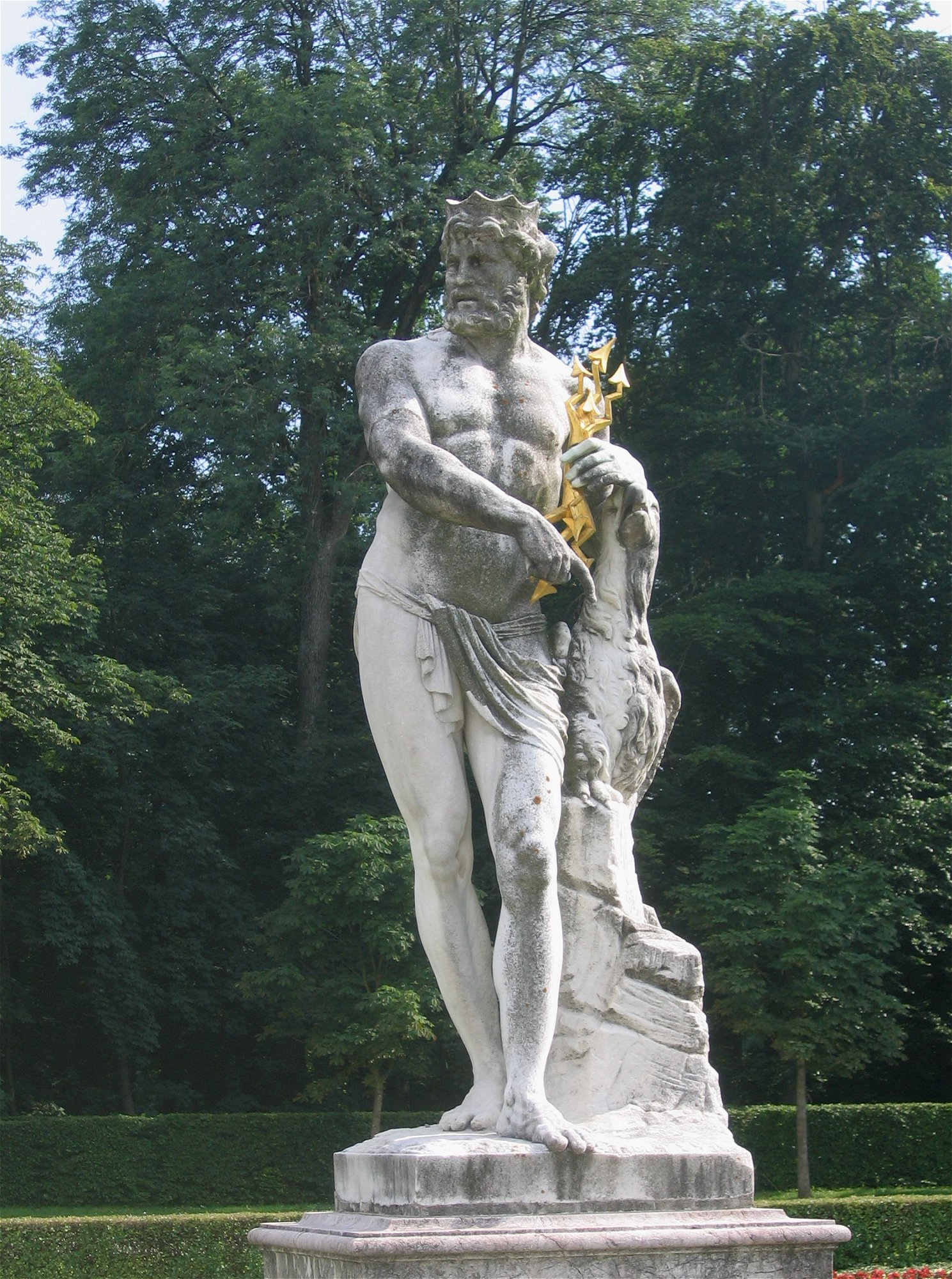
Nymphenburg statue: Jupiter

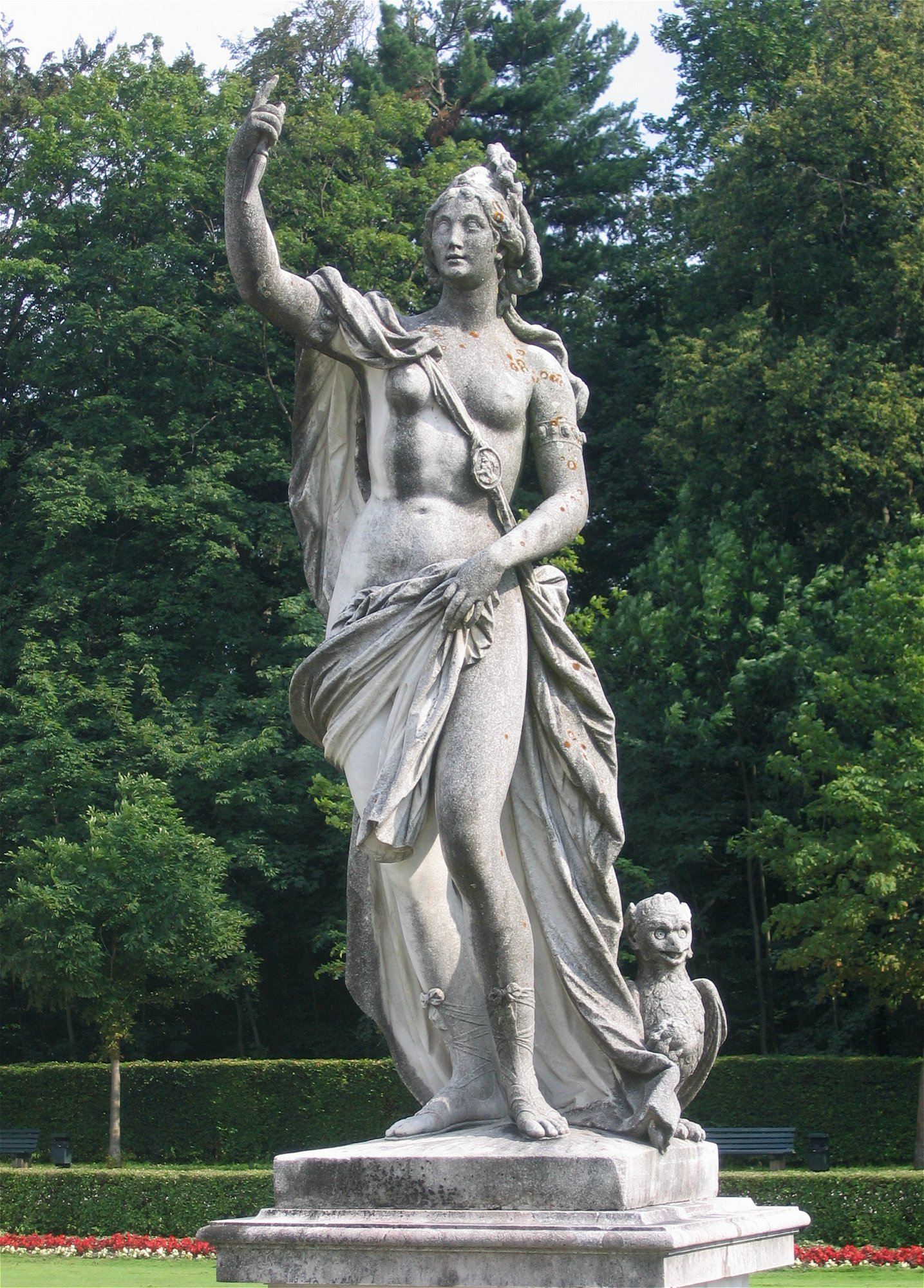
Nymphenburg statue: Proserpina
