= Franz Anton Bustelli =

German sculptor and potter (1723–1763)

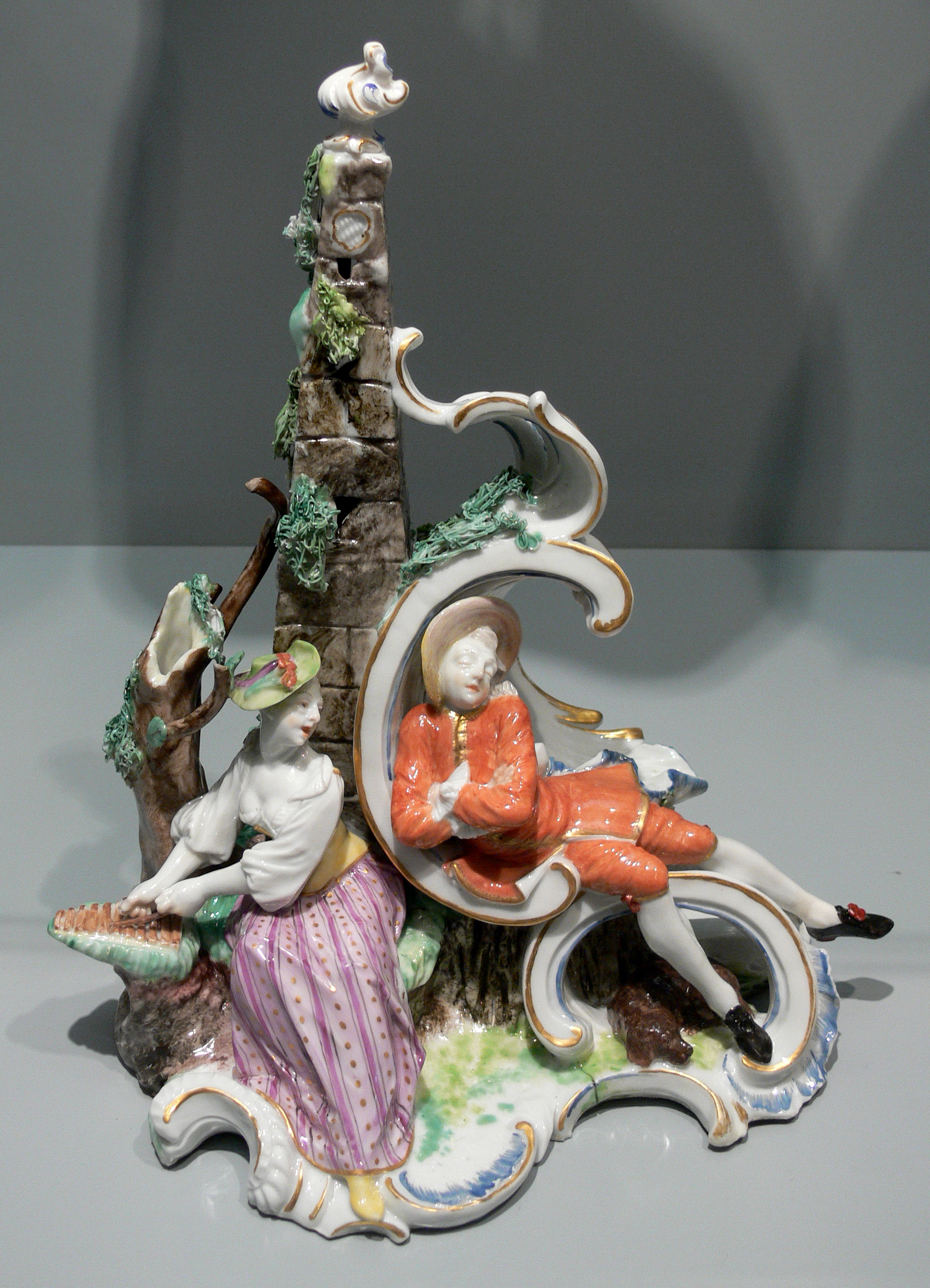
The Sleeper Disturbed, Nymphenburg, 24 cm high; the integration of decorative scroll-work into the composition is characteristic.

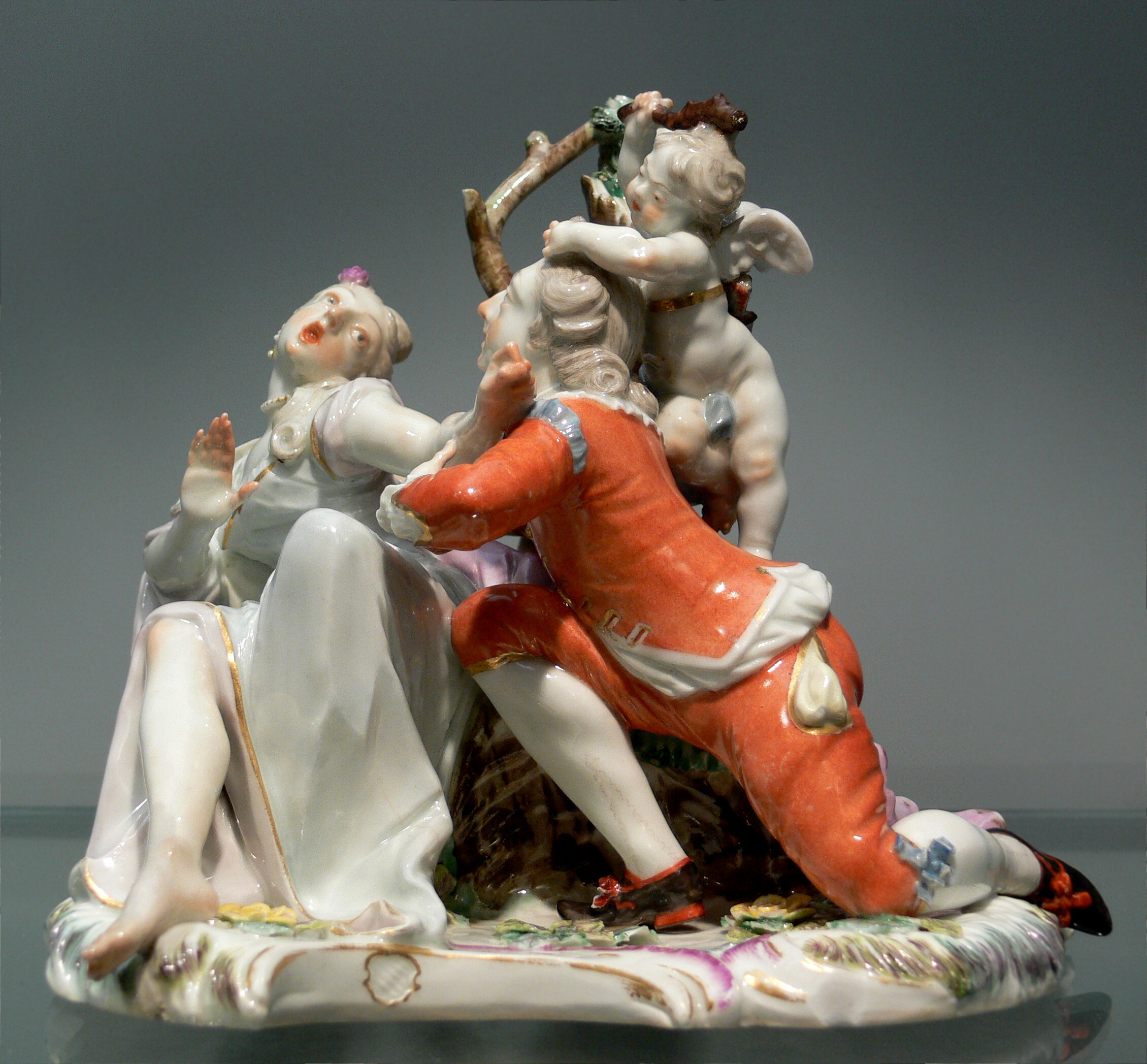
Another Bustelli group, The Tempestuous Lovers, 1760, 14.4 cm high. See note for the same group in plain white, from another view.

Franz Anton Bustelli (12 April 1723 – 18 April 1763) was a Swiss-born German modeller for the Bavarian Nymphenburg Porcelain Manufactory from 1754 to his death in 1763. He is widely regarded as the finest modeller of porcelain in the Rococo style: "if the art of European porcelain finds its most perfect expression in the rococo style, so the style finds its most perfect expression in the work of Bustelli".

Bustelli was born in Locarno in Italian-speaking Switzerland, and died in Munich, Bavaria, just after his 40th birthday. Few details of his life are known, but he trained as a sculptor, probably mostly in wood, in Italy. He spoke and wrote German fluently, and may have grown up in Bavaria.

== Nymphenburg ==
Bustelli joined the Neudeck factory in Munich in 1754, the year after it was established by the local ruler, Maximilian III Joseph, Elector of Bavaria. That year the elector placed Sigmund Graf von Haimhausen in charge of the factory. The factory moved in 1761 to the grounds of the elector's Nymphenburg Palace near Munich, where it remains today, but its products are normally referred to as Nymphenburg for the earlier period as well. It was a relatively late entrant to the group of porcelain factories set up in Europe as the secrets of the techniques developed by Johann Friedrich Böttger for the Meissen factory in Saxony (established in 1710) gradually leaked out. Bustelli was rapidly promoted to Modellmeister, or head modeller, and created moulds for about 150 new models for Neudeck and Nymphenburg.

His first figures were small classical gods and putti, followed by a series of street vendors, as well as some larger religious figures, including a crucifixion, that follow directly from the style of South German woodcarving of the period. In a series of Chinese and Turkish figures, from about 1756 onwards, reflecting the Rococo taste for chinoiserie and Orientalism, he reached the height of his powers, seen in the mature figures of the following years. The most famous of his works is a set of eight pairs of male and female single figures whose glances interact, portraying characters in the Commedia dell'arte (1759–1760). These were followed by groups of paired lovers and other figures, such as hounds. He was involved in the design of a large dinner service for the elector, though the elaborate individual paintings, by Joseph Zächenberger, were not completed until after his death.

Bustelli produced models that were made into moulds, and after Nymphenburg introduced painted figures in 1756, he executed or designed the paint scheme for a finished model to be followed by the factory's painters. Models were produced in both polychrome and plain white examples, with the latter more numerous, and the colouring often varying considerably between examples (see picture above). With the older, and far more prolific, modeller Johann Joachim Kaendler of Meissen, Bustelli is the outstanding figure of Rococo porcelain, and his best work has a unique grace, energy, drama and often wit. His figures are thoroughly designed in the round, meant to be appreciated from all angles. The bases are unusually thin, and often include scrollwork that integrates elegantly with the figures. Some subjects are drawn from engravings, and many seem to show the influence of the conventional theatrical gestures of the period.

He was not very highly paid, and his possessions at his death included furniture and personal effects, some of his own figures, 228 engravings, and 31 books on chemistry

Today many Bustelli designs continue to be produced by Nymphenburg, though not from the original moulds, and using modern stamps. Original figures may fetch over $150,000. The best collections of original pieces are in Munich, in the Bavarian National Museum, where a whole room is devoted to his work, and the Bäuml collection in the Marstallmuseum in Nymphenburg Palace; the Bäuml family owned the factory between 1888 and 1975. Other museums all over the world have examples.

5196 Bustelli (3102 T-2) is a main belt asteroid, discovered in 1973 and named after Bustelli; Böttger and Kaendler of Meissen have the two preceding numbers.

== Sources ==
- Gordon Campbell, The Grove Encyclopedia of Decorative Arts, Volume 1, "Bustelli, Franz-Anton (p. 163), Oxford University Press US, 2006, ISBN 0-19-518948-5, ISBN 978-0-19-518948-3
- George Savage, Porcelain Through the Ages, Penguin, (2nd edn.) 1963
- See German article for extensive bibliography of works in German
