= Nymphenburg Porcelain Manufactory =

German Porcelain Manufactory

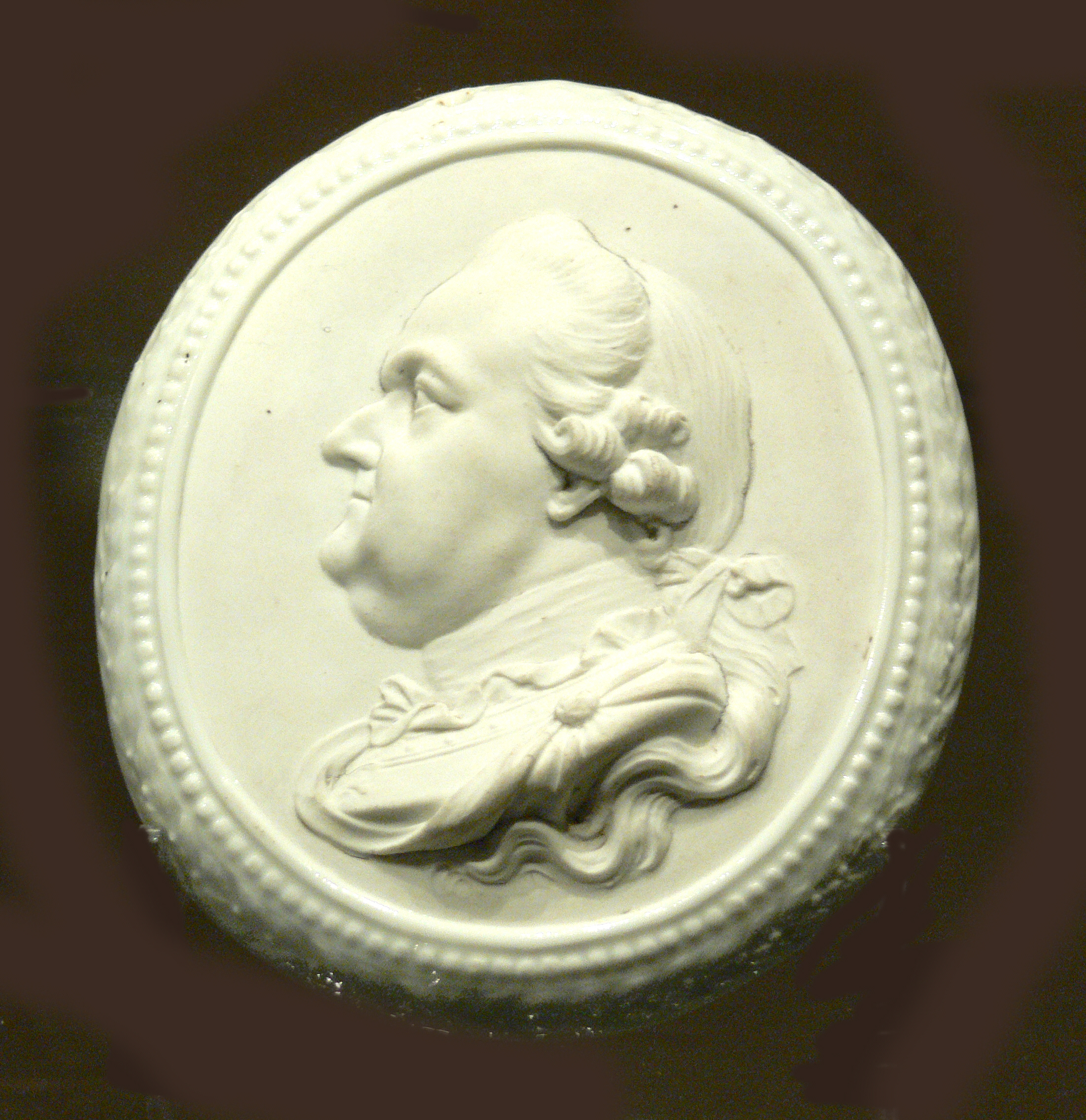
- Native name: Königliche Porzellan Manufaktur Nymphenburg GmbH & Co. KG
- Company type: Private (GmbH & Co. KG)
- Industry: Ceramics
- Founded: Electorate of Bavaria, Holy Roman Empire (1747)
- Founder: Maximilian III Joseph, Elector of Bavaria
- Headquarters: Munich, Germany
- Key people: Joseph Jakob Ringler, Franz Anton Bustelli, Sigmund von Haimhausen, Albert Bäuml
- Products: Tableware
- Revenue: Maximum of 10 million euros
- Owner: Wittelsbach Compensation Fund and Prince Luitpold of Bavaria
- Number of employees: 70 in Germany
- Website: www.nymphenburg.com

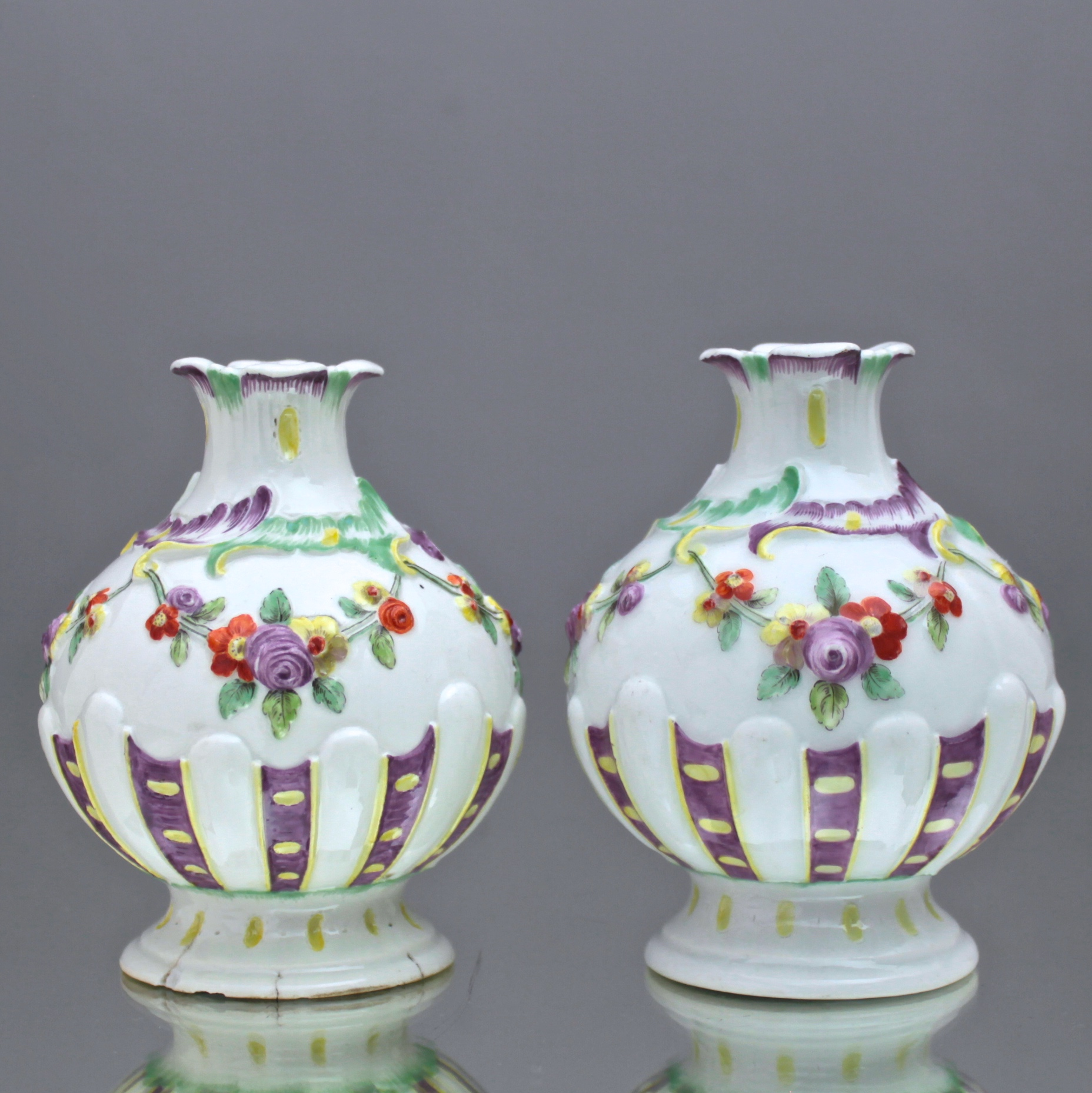
Nymphenburg: Pair of small table vases, probably by J. Häringer, c. 1760

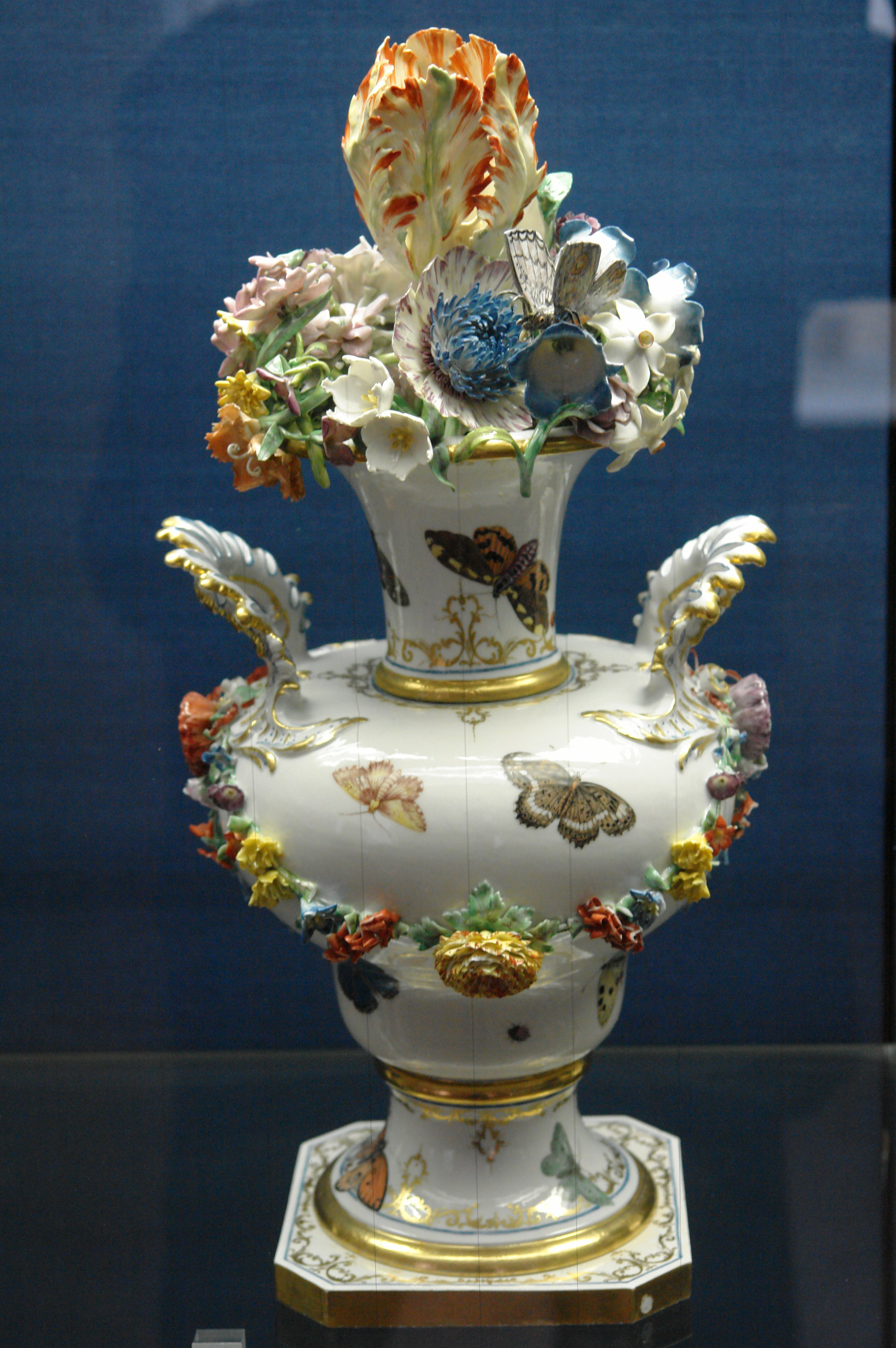
Nymphenburg porcelain tableware, c. 1760–1765

The Nymphenburg Porcelain Manufactory (German: Porzellan Manufaktur Nymphenburg) is located at the Nördliches Schloßrondell (northern palace circle) in one of the Cavalier Houses in front of the Nymphenburg Palace in Munich, Germany, and since its establishment in 1747 has produced porcelain of high quality. It is one of the last porcelain producers in the world where every single part is made entirely by hand.

== History ==
After his accession in 1745 Maximilian III Joseph, Elector of Bavaria, commanded the establishment of manufacturing companies in order to bail out the state finances. On 11 November 1747 the first manufactory with potters and modelling shops, painting and writing rooms was set up at the Grüne Schlössl, Neudeck Castle formerly located in the area of the modern day Munich borough of Au-Haidhausen. Not until 1754 after Joseph Jakob Ringler had mastered the complex processes of production, regular manufacture of porcelain finally began to succeed. In the same year the rococo porcelain sculptor Franz Anton Bustelli came to work at the factory. In 1755 the factory received its first commission from the Bavarian court and in 1756 came the first success in painting the porcelain in colour. The skillful management of lawyer and entrepreneur Count Sigmund von Haimhausen ensured that by 1758 the factory was placed on a sound commercial footing. In 1761 the manufacture moved to a Cavalier house, a prestigious two-storey hipped roof building with a semicircular risalit center and structured plaster on the grand circle near the main entrance of the Nymphenburg Palace, where it is still located today.

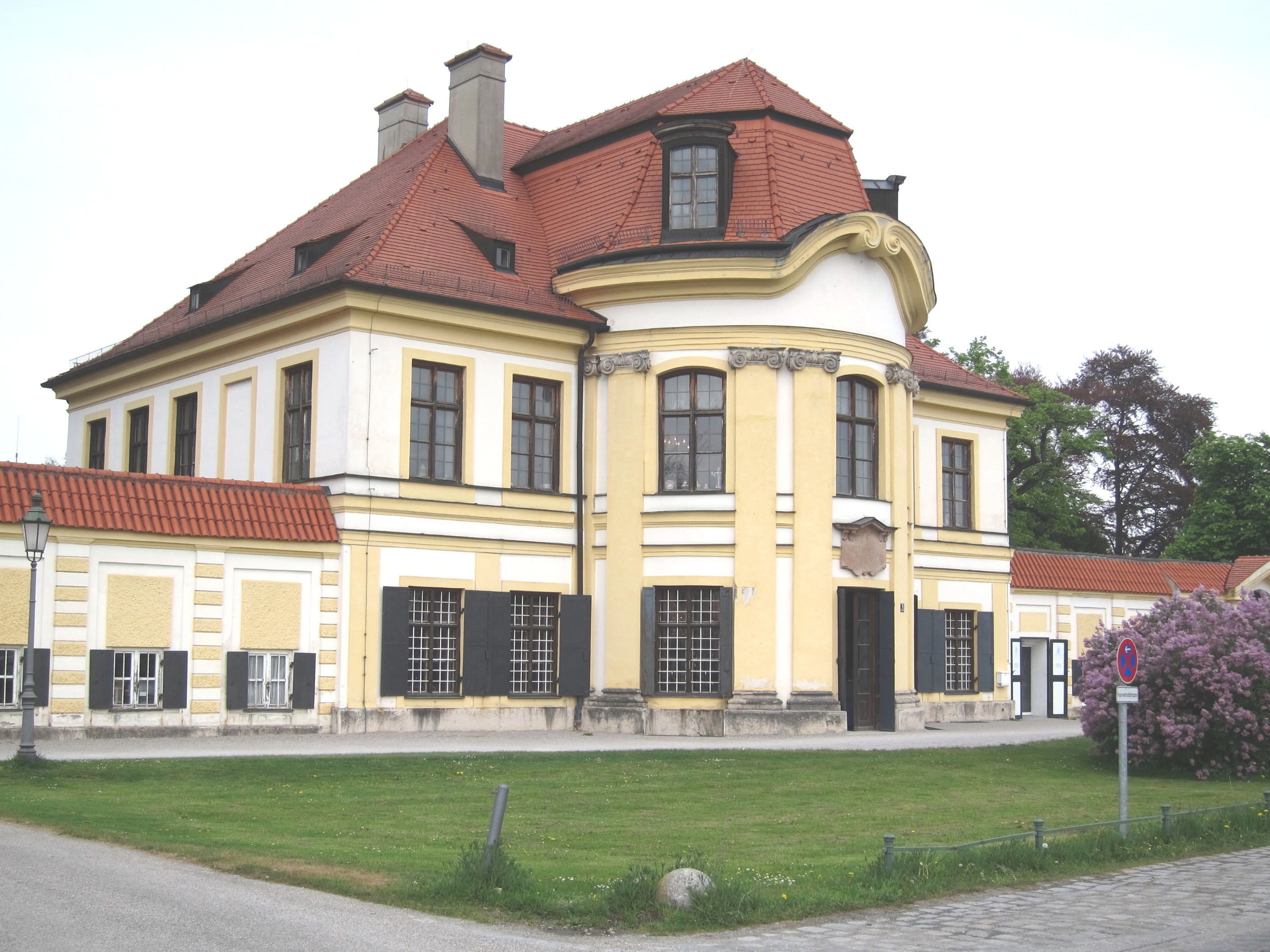
The cavalier house on the grand circle in front of Nymphenburg Palace, production site since 1761

Among the artists who followed Bustelli were Dominik Auliczek the elder (1734–1804) and Johann Peter Melchior. A great promoter of the works was Ludwig I, who gave them many commissions. Particular favourites were dinner services with copies of famous paintings or with Bavarian landscapes in an antique style.

In 1822 Friedrich von Gärtner, the fashionable architect, was appointed artistic director of the factory. In the middle of the 19th century, its financial position deteriorated to the extent that in 1856 all artistic production was halted and it was decided to privatise the factory. It was leased out for the first time in 1862 and its focus shifted to the production of technical, medical and sanitary porcelain goods.

In 1887 Albert Bäuml (1855–1929) took a lease of the factory. His aim was to regain the previous high artistic level of the factory's products: it was Bäuml, for example, who "rediscovered" Bustelli. This aim was realised at around the turn of the 19th and 20th centuries and besides historical copies, elegant Jugendstil ceramics were developed.

The product range includes services, mocca cups, figurines, animal figurines, Bavarica, baskets, vases, maiolica, table decoration and accessories. The customers of these exquisite products include the international aristocracy, embassies, churches and palaces at home and abroad.

Since 1975 the factory has been leased by the Free State of Bavaria to the Wittelsbach Compensation Fund (Wittelsbacher Ausgleichsfonds), a holding in the form of a foundation in the hands of the former royal family. In 2011 the lease contract was taken over by Prince Luitpold of Bavaria as owner of Königliche Porzellan Manufaktur Nymphenburg GmbH & Co. KG. The historic production buildings since 1761 now belong to the Bavarian Administration of State-Owned Palaces, Gardens and Lakes, which rents them out to the respective operator.

The Nymphenburg Porcelain Museum (the Bäuml Collection, founded by a former owner of the manufactory), is located on the upper floor of the Marstallmuseum in the left wing of the palace itself. Over 1,000 exhibits, beginning in 1747, are on display. Showpieces are the figures from the Commedia dell’arte by Franz Anton Bustelli and the figures by Dominik Auliczek from 1770. The current owner of the Nypmphenburg Porcelain Manufactory, Luitpold Prince of Bavaria, presents the service of his great-grandfather King Ludwig III of Bavaria from his private collection. Nymphenburg Palace is known to have been the working place of artists and sculptors like Hanns Goebl and William Brand. Guided tours through the factory can be arranged by prior appointment.

== Today's products ==
The factory now has around 60 employees and production is carried out exclusively by hand. Most of the employees working in the turning, painting, kiln and gilding workshops have artistic training and learn traditional craft techniques in a three-year training course within the manufactory. The manufactory has almost all historical archive samples and produces entire services or missing parts based on these samples to order. If desired, old patterns are also modernized. The traditional porcelain lion with the Bavarian coat of arms is a popular gift from companies or the Bavarian state government. Porcelain dogs of various breeds are also popular.

Furthermore, modern to avant-garde service or decorative objects are produced, whereby the patterns are not designed by an in-house development department, but rather well-known contemporary designers and artists are commissioned with the designs. In the 21st century, these have included Konstantin Grcic, Hella Jongerius, Kiki Smith, Joep van Lieshout, Olaf Nicolai and Carsten Höller.

The classical figurines of the Commedia dell'arte with their baroque costumes were redressed as fashionistas in collaboration with fashion designers such as Christian Lacroix or Vivienne Westwood. Some celebrities such as Kate Moss and Damien Hirst also ordered sculptures of themselves or their works of art. Elton John is also a customer.

Prince Luitpold converted the upper floors of the cavalier house, which previously housed the manufactory's administration (production takes place in buildings at the rear), into a luxury holiday home in 2025, available for daily rental, under the name Nymphenburg Palace Royal Residence. It is managed by Kempinski Hotels. The luxury suite, furnished with decorative objects, wall lamps, centerpieces and porcelain pictures, is intended to serve as accommodation for affluent and culturally minded visitors to the city or for wedding couples.

== See also ==
- Porcelain manufacturing companies in Europe

== Bibliography ==
- Marita Krauss: Die königlich-bayerischen Hoflieferanten. Volk Verlag, Munich 2008, ISBN 978-3-937200-27-9,
- Katharina Hantschmann: Nymphenburger Porzellan 1797 bis 1847. Geschichte, Modelle, Dekore. Klinkhardt und Biermann, Munich 1996, ISBN 3-7814-0390-4,
- Friedrich H. Hofmann: Geschichte der bayerischen Porzellan-Manufaktur Nymphenburg. 3 Volumes. Hiersemann, Leipzig 1921–1923, reprint: Scherer, Edition Arkanum, Berlin 1991, ISBN 3-89433-009-0.
- Barbara Krafft, Max Oppel: 250 Jahre Porzellan-Manufaktur Nymphenburg 1747 – 1997. IP-Verlags-Gesellschaft, Munich 1997, ISBN 3-00-001191-9.
- Timo Nüßlein: Paul Ludwig Troost (1878–1934). Böhlau, Wien u. a. 2012, ISBN 978-3-205-78865-2,
- Timo Nüßlein: Der „Erste Baumeister des Dritten Reichs“ und das Porzellan – Paul Ludwig Troost und die Staatliche Porzellanmanufaktur Nymphenburg, in: Keramos 220, ISSN 0453-7580, Gesellschaft der Keramikfreunde, Deggendorf 2013.
- Arno Schönberger: Nymphenburger Porzellan. Prestel, Munich 1949 (Bilderhefte des Bayerischen Nationalmuseums München 4).
- Rainer Schuster: Nymphenburger Porzellan. Kostbarkeiten aus der Sammlung Bäuml und dem Residenzmuseum Munich. Bayerische Verwaltung der staatlichen Schlösser, Gärten und Seen, Munich 1997, ISBN 3-9805654-0-8.
- Rosel Termolen (Hrsg.): Nymphenburger Porzellan. 3. Auflage. Rosenheimer, Rosenheim 1997, ISBN 3-475-52504-6,
- Hans Thoma: Porzellan-Manufaktur Nymphenburg. 1747–1947. Zweihundert Jahre Nymphenburg. Bruckmann, Munich 1947.
- Alfred Ziffer: Nymphenburger Porzellan. Sammlung Bäuml. Arnold, Stuttgart 1997, ISBN 3-925369-61-9.
- Rainer Schuster, 1997. Nymphenburger Porzellan. Kostbarkeiten aus der Sammlung Bäuml und dem Residenzmuseum München. Munich: Bayerische Verwaltung der staatlichen Schlösser, Gärten und Seen.
